

211001–211100 

|-bgcolor=#d6d6d6
| 211001 ||  || — || December 14, 2001 || Socorro || LINEAR || — || align=right | 4.8 km || 
|-id=002 bgcolor=#fefefe
| 211002 ||  || — || December 14, 2001 || Socorro || LINEAR || — || align=right data-sort-value="0.73" | 730 m || 
|-id=003 bgcolor=#fefefe
| 211003 ||  || — || December 14, 2001 || Socorro || LINEAR || — || align=right data-sort-value="0.83" | 830 m || 
|-id=004 bgcolor=#d6d6d6
| 211004 ||  || — || December 14, 2001 || Socorro || LINEAR || — || align=right | 3.2 km || 
|-id=005 bgcolor=#fefefe
| 211005 ||  || — || December 14, 2001 || Socorro || LINEAR || — || align=right | 1.2 km || 
|-id=006 bgcolor=#fefefe
| 211006 ||  || — || December 14, 2001 || Socorro || LINEAR || FLO || align=right | 1.1 km || 
|-id=007 bgcolor=#fefefe
| 211007 ||  || — || December 14, 2001 || Socorro || LINEAR || FLO || align=right data-sort-value="0.97" | 970 m || 
|-id=008 bgcolor=#d6d6d6
| 211008 ||  || — || December 11, 2001 || Socorro || LINEAR || — || align=right | 4.5 km || 
|-id=009 bgcolor=#d6d6d6
| 211009 ||  || — || December 15, 2001 || Socorro || LINEAR || THM || align=right | 3.6 km || 
|-id=010 bgcolor=#d6d6d6
| 211010 ||  || — || December 14, 2001 || Kitt Peak || Spacewatch || THM || align=right | 3.4 km || 
|-id=011 bgcolor=#d6d6d6
| 211011 ||  || — || December 17, 2001 || Socorro || LINEAR || THM || align=right | 2.9 km || 
|-id=012 bgcolor=#E9E9E9
| 211012 ||  || — || December 17, 2001 || Socorro || LINEAR || — || align=right | 3.1 km || 
|-id=013 bgcolor=#E9E9E9
| 211013 ||  || — || December 18, 2001 || Socorro || LINEAR || AGN || align=right | 1.8 km || 
|-id=014 bgcolor=#fefefe
| 211014 ||  || — || December 18, 2001 || Socorro || LINEAR || FLO || align=right data-sort-value="0.85" | 850 m || 
|-id=015 bgcolor=#fefefe
| 211015 ||  || — || December 18, 2001 || Socorro || LINEAR || FLO || align=right data-sort-value="0.94" | 940 m || 
|-id=016 bgcolor=#fefefe
| 211016 ||  || — || December 18, 2001 || Socorro || LINEAR || — || align=right | 1.3 km || 
|-id=017 bgcolor=#fefefe
| 211017 ||  || — || December 18, 2001 || Palomar || NEAT || — || align=right | 1.2 km || 
|-id=018 bgcolor=#d6d6d6
| 211018 ||  || — || December 17, 2001 || Socorro || LINEAR || THM || align=right | 3.4 km || 
|-id=019 bgcolor=#d6d6d6
| 211019 ||  || — || December 19, 2001 || Anderson Mesa || LONEOS || — || align=right | 4.7 km || 
|-id=020 bgcolor=#d6d6d6
| 211020 ||  || — || December 20, 2001 || Palomar || NEAT || — || align=right | 5.0 km || 
|-id=021 bgcolor=#fefefe
| 211021 Johnpercin ||  ||  || December 18, 2001 || Apache Point || SDSS || V || align=right data-sort-value="0.77" | 770 m || 
|-id=022 bgcolor=#d6d6d6
| 211022 ||  || — || January 6, 2002 || Socorro || LINEAR || — || align=right | 5.3 km || 
|-id=023 bgcolor=#fefefe
| 211023 ||  || — || January 8, 2002 || Socorro || LINEAR || — || align=right | 1.1 km || 
|-id=024 bgcolor=#fefefe
| 211024 ||  || — || January 9, 2002 || Socorro || LINEAR || — || align=right data-sort-value="0.90" | 900 m || 
|-id=025 bgcolor=#fefefe
| 211025 ||  || — || January 8, 2002 || Palomar || NEAT || FLO || align=right data-sort-value="0.99" | 990 m || 
|-id=026 bgcolor=#fefefe
| 211026 ||  || — || January 8, 2002 || Socorro || LINEAR || — || align=right | 1.1 km || 
|-id=027 bgcolor=#fefefe
| 211027 ||  || — || January 9, 2002 || Socorro || LINEAR || FLO || align=right | 1.0 km || 
|-id=028 bgcolor=#fefefe
| 211028 ||  || — || January 9, 2002 || Socorro || LINEAR || — || align=right | 1.2 km || 
|-id=029 bgcolor=#fefefe
| 211029 ||  || — || January 13, 2002 || Socorro || LINEAR || FLO || align=right data-sort-value="0.69" | 690 m || 
|-id=030 bgcolor=#fefefe
| 211030 ||  || — || January 13, 2002 || Socorro || LINEAR || — || align=right data-sort-value="0.75" | 750 m || 
|-id=031 bgcolor=#fefefe
| 211031 ||  || — || January 13, 2002 || Socorro || LINEAR || NYS || align=right data-sort-value="0.90" | 900 m || 
|-id=032 bgcolor=#fefefe
| 211032 ||  || — || January 13, 2002 || Socorro || LINEAR || FLO || align=right | 1.0 km || 
|-id=033 bgcolor=#fefefe
| 211033 ||  || — || January 13, 2002 || Socorro || LINEAR || — || align=right | 1.0 km || 
|-id=034 bgcolor=#fefefe
| 211034 ||  || — || January 5, 2002 || Palomar || NEAT || FLO || align=right data-sort-value="0.98" | 980 m || 
|-id=035 bgcolor=#d6d6d6
| 211035 ||  || — || January 6, 2002 || Anderson Mesa || LONEOS || — || align=right | 5.1 km || 
|-id=036 bgcolor=#fefefe
| 211036 ||  || — || January 19, 2002 || Socorro || LINEAR || — || align=right | 1.2 km || 
|-id=037 bgcolor=#fefefe
| 211037 ||  || — || January 20, 2002 || Anderson Mesa || LONEOS || — || align=right | 1.1 km || 
|-id=038 bgcolor=#fefefe
| 211038 ||  || — || February 6, 2002 || Socorro || LINEAR || — || align=right | 1.8 km || 
|-id=039 bgcolor=#fefefe
| 211039 ||  || — || February 6, 2002 || Socorro || LINEAR || PHO || align=right | 1.5 km || 
|-id=040 bgcolor=#fefefe
| 211040 ||  || — || February 4, 2002 || Palomar || NEAT || — || align=right data-sort-value="0.96" | 960 m || 
|-id=041 bgcolor=#fefefe
| 211041 ||  || — || February 5, 2002 || Palomar || NEAT || — || align=right | 1.2 km || 
|-id=042 bgcolor=#FA8072
| 211042 ||  || — || February 8, 2002 || Socorro || LINEAR || — || align=right | 2.0 km || 
|-id=043 bgcolor=#fefefe
| 211043 ||  || — || February 6, 2002 || Socorro || LINEAR || — || align=right | 1.1 km || 
|-id=044 bgcolor=#fefefe
| 211044 ||  || — || February 6, 2002 || Socorro || LINEAR || — || align=right | 1.1 km || 
|-id=045 bgcolor=#fefefe
| 211045 ||  || — || February 12, 2002 || Fountain Hills || C. W. Juels, P. R. Holvorcem || — || align=right | 3.6 km || 
|-id=046 bgcolor=#fefefe
| 211046 ||  || — || February 8, 2002 || Socorro || LINEAR || — || align=right | 1.8 km || 
|-id=047 bgcolor=#fefefe
| 211047 ||  || — || February 10, 2002 || Socorro || LINEAR || FLO || align=right data-sort-value="0.82" | 820 m || 
|-id=048 bgcolor=#fefefe
| 211048 ||  || — || February 3, 2002 || Haleakala || NEAT || FLO || align=right | 1.3 km || 
|-id=049 bgcolor=#fefefe
| 211049 ||  || — || February 12, 2002 || Desert Eagle || W. K. Y. Yeung || NYS || align=right | 1.1 km || 
|-id=050 bgcolor=#fefefe
| 211050 ||  || — || February 12, 2002 || Desert Eagle || W. K. Y. Yeung || — || align=right data-sort-value="0.90" | 900 m || 
|-id=051 bgcolor=#fefefe
| 211051 ||  || — || February 12, 2002 || Desert Eagle || W. K. Y. Yeung || NYS || align=right | 2.2 km || 
|-id=052 bgcolor=#fefefe
| 211052 ||  || — || February 6, 2002 || Socorro || LINEAR || — || align=right | 1.1 km || 
|-id=053 bgcolor=#fefefe
| 211053 ||  || — || February 6, 2002 || Socorro || LINEAR || — || align=right | 1.3 km || 
|-id=054 bgcolor=#fefefe
| 211054 ||  || — || February 7, 2002 || Socorro || LINEAR || FLO || align=right | 1.00 km || 
|-id=055 bgcolor=#fefefe
| 211055 ||  || — || February 7, 2002 || Socorro || LINEAR || — || align=right | 1.2 km || 
|-id=056 bgcolor=#fefefe
| 211056 ||  || — || February 8, 2002 || Socorro || LINEAR || — || align=right | 1.1 km || 
|-id=057 bgcolor=#fefefe
| 211057 ||  || — || February 7, 2002 || Socorro || LINEAR || FLO || align=right data-sort-value="0.99" | 990 m || 
|-id=058 bgcolor=#fefefe
| 211058 ||  || — || February 7, 2002 || Socorro || LINEAR || — || align=right data-sort-value="0.91" | 910 m || 
|-id=059 bgcolor=#fefefe
| 211059 ||  || — || February 7, 2002 || Socorro || LINEAR || — || align=right | 1.2 km || 
|-id=060 bgcolor=#fefefe
| 211060 ||  || — || February 7, 2002 || Socorro || LINEAR || NYS || align=right data-sort-value="0.81" | 810 m || 
|-id=061 bgcolor=#fefefe
| 211061 ||  || — || February 8, 2002 || Socorro || LINEAR || — || align=right | 1.2 km || 
|-id=062 bgcolor=#fefefe
| 211062 ||  || — || February 8, 2002 || Socorro || LINEAR || FLO || align=right | 1.0 km || 
|-id=063 bgcolor=#fefefe
| 211063 ||  || — || February 6, 2002 || Socorro || LINEAR || — || align=right | 1.2 km || 
|-id=064 bgcolor=#fefefe
| 211064 ||  || — || February 8, 2002 || Socorro || LINEAR || — || align=right | 1.00 km || 
|-id=065 bgcolor=#fefefe
| 211065 ||  || — || February 8, 2002 || Socorro || LINEAR || V || align=right data-sort-value="0.98" | 980 m || 
|-id=066 bgcolor=#fefefe
| 211066 ||  || — || February 8, 2002 || Socorro || LINEAR || NYS || align=right | 2.2 km || 
|-id=067 bgcolor=#fefefe
| 211067 ||  || — || February 10, 2002 || Socorro || LINEAR || — || align=right | 1.1 km || 
|-id=068 bgcolor=#fefefe
| 211068 ||  || — || February 10, 2002 || Socorro || LINEAR || — || align=right | 1.2 km || 
|-id=069 bgcolor=#fefefe
| 211069 ||  || — || February 10, 2002 || Socorro || LINEAR || FLO || align=right data-sort-value="0.94" | 940 m || 
|-id=070 bgcolor=#fefefe
| 211070 ||  || — || February 10, 2002 || Socorro || LINEAR || FLO || align=right | 1.0 km || 
|-id=071 bgcolor=#fefefe
| 211071 ||  || — || February 10, 2002 || Socorro || LINEAR || V || align=right | 1.0 km || 
|-id=072 bgcolor=#fefefe
| 211072 ||  || — || February 11, 2002 || Socorro || LINEAR || — || align=right | 1.2 km || 
|-id=073 bgcolor=#fefefe
| 211073 ||  || — || February 11, 2002 || Socorro || LINEAR || — || align=right | 1.1 km || 
|-id=074 bgcolor=#fefefe
| 211074 ||  || — || February 11, 2002 || Socorro || LINEAR || NYS || align=right | 1.2 km || 
|-id=075 bgcolor=#fefefe
| 211075 ||  || — || February 13, 2002 || Socorro || LINEAR || — || align=right | 1.3 km || 
|-id=076 bgcolor=#fefefe
| 211076 ||  || — || February 4, 2002 || Anderson Mesa || LONEOS || FLO || align=right | 1.2 km || 
|-id=077 bgcolor=#d6d6d6
| 211077 ||  || — || February 8, 2002 || Kitt Peak || M. W. Buie || — || align=right | 3.3 km || 
|-id=078 bgcolor=#FA8072
| 211078 ||  || — || March 10, 2002 || Haleakala || NEAT || — || align=right | 1.2 km || 
|-id=079 bgcolor=#fefefe
| 211079 ||  || — || March 7, 2002 || Cima Ekar || ADAS || — || align=right | 1.1 km || 
|-id=080 bgcolor=#fefefe
| 211080 ||  || — || March 13, 2002 || Desert Eagle || W. K. Y. Yeung || — || align=right | 1.2 km || 
|-id=081 bgcolor=#fefefe
| 211081 ||  || — || March 5, 2002 || Kitt Peak || Spacewatch || NYS || align=right data-sort-value="0.69" | 690 m || 
|-id=082 bgcolor=#fefefe
| 211082 ||  || — || March 10, 2002 || Haleakala || NEAT || — || align=right | 1.3 km || 
|-id=083 bgcolor=#fefefe
| 211083 ||  || — || March 11, 2002 || Palomar || NEAT || FLO || align=right | 1.00 km || 
|-id=084 bgcolor=#fefefe
| 211084 ||  || — || March 11, 2002 || Palomar || NEAT || V || align=right | 1.2 km || 
|-id=085 bgcolor=#fefefe
| 211085 ||  || — || March 10, 2002 || Haleakala || NEAT || V || align=right data-sort-value="0.83" | 830 m || 
|-id=086 bgcolor=#fefefe
| 211086 ||  || — || March 12, 2002 || Palomar || NEAT || FLO || align=right data-sort-value="0.81" | 810 m || 
|-id=087 bgcolor=#fefefe
| 211087 ||  || — || March 9, 2002 || Socorro || LINEAR || NYS || align=right data-sort-value="0.72" | 720 m || 
|-id=088 bgcolor=#fefefe
| 211088 ||  || — || March 13, 2002 || Socorro || LINEAR || V || align=right data-sort-value="0.74" | 740 m || 
|-id=089 bgcolor=#fefefe
| 211089 ||  || — || March 13, 2002 || Socorro || LINEAR || FLO || align=right data-sort-value="0.93" | 930 m || 
|-id=090 bgcolor=#fefefe
| 211090 ||  || — || March 13, 2002 || Socorro || LINEAR || — || align=right | 1.2 km || 
|-id=091 bgcolor=#fefefe
| 211091 ||  || — || March 13, 2002 || Socorro || LINEAR || — || align=right | 1.1 km || 
|-id=092 bgcolor=#fefefe
| 211092 ||  || — || March 13, 2002 || Socorro || LINEAR || — || align=right | 1.2 km || 
|-id=093 bgcolor=#fefefe
| 211093 ||  || — || March 11, 2002 || Kitt Peak || Spacewatch || FLO || align=right | 1.3 km || 
|-id=094 bgcolor=#fefefe
| 211094 ||  || — || March 13, 2002 || Palomar || NEAT || — || align=right | 1.0 km || 
|-id=095 bgcolor=#fefefe
| 211095 ||  || — || March 12, 2002 || Socorro || LINEAR || — || align=right | 1.2 km || 
|-id=096 bgcolor=#fefefe
| 211096 ||  || — || March 12, 2002 || Socorro || LINEAR || — || align=right | 1.2 km || 
|-id=097 bgcolor=#fefefe
| 211097 ||  || — || March 13, 2002 || Socorro || LINEAR || NYS || align=right data-sort-value="0.98" | 980 m || 
|-id=098 bgcolor=#fefefe
| 211098 ||  || — || March 9, 2002 || Anderson Mesa || LONEOS || — || align=right | 1.2 km || 
|-id=099 bgcolor=#fefefe
| 211099 ||  || — || March 9, 2002 || Palomar || NEAT || FLO || align=right data-sort-value="0.94" | 940 m || 
|-id=100 bgcolor=#fefefe
| 211100 ||  || — || March 9, 2002 || Kitt Peak || Spacewatch || — || align=right data-sort-value="0.67" | 670 m || 
|}

211101–211200 

|-bgcolor=#fefefe
| 211101 ||  || — || March 11, 2002 || Palomar || NEAT || — || align=right | 1.1 km || 
|-id=102 bgcolor=#fefefe
| 211102 ||  || — || March 12, 2002 || Anderson Mesa || LONEOS || — || align=right | 1.2 km || 
|-id=103 bgcolor=#fefefe
| 211103 ||  || — || March 13, 2002 || Palomar || NEAT || V || align=right | 1.1 km || 
|-id=104 bgcolor=#fefefe
| 211104 ||  || — || March 13, 2002 || Socorro || LINEAR || NYS || align=right | 1.0 km || 
|-id=105 bgcolor=#fefefe
| 211105 ||  || — || March 15, 2002 || Palomar || NEAT || EUT || align=right data-sort-value="0.73" | 730 m || 
|-id=106 bgcolor=#fefefe
| 211106 Francinewetzel ||  ||  || March 15, 2002 || Kitt Peak || Spacewatch || — || align=right | 1.3 km || 
|-id=107 bgcolor=#fefefe
| 211107 ||  || — || March 15, 2002 || Socorro || LINEAR || ERI || align=right | 2.3 km || 
|-id=108 bgcolor=#fefefe
| 211108 ||  || — || March 15, 2002 || Palomar || NEAT || — || align=right | 1.0 km || 
|-id=109 bgcolor=#fefefe
| 211109 ||  || — || March 10, 2002 || Haleakala || NEAT || — || align=right | 1.4 km || 
|-id=110 bgcolor=#fefefe
| 211110 ||  || — || March 18, 2002 || Kitt Peak || Spacewatch || — || align=right data-sort-value="0.90" | 900 m || 
|-id=111 bgcolor=#fefefe
| 211111 ||  || — || March 20, 2002 || Socorro || LINEAR || — || align=right | 1.5 km || 
|-id=112 bgcolor=#fefefe
| 211112 ||  || — || March 20, 2002 || Anderson Mesa || LONEOS || — || align=right | 1.4 km || 
|-id=113 bgcolor=#fefefe
| 211113 ||  || — || March 20, 2002 || Socorro || LINEAR || ERI || align=right | 2.4 km || 
|-id=114 bgcolor=#fefefe
| 211114 ||  || — || March 20, 2002 || Anderson Mesa || LONEOS || — || align=right | 1.4 km || 
|-id=115 bgcolor=#fefefe
| 211115 ||  || — || March 21, 2002 || Kitt Peak || Spacewatch || — || align=right | 1.1 km || 
|-id=116 bgcolor=#fefefe
| 211116 ||  || — || April 4, 2002 || Socorro || LINEAR || — || align=right | 1.9 km || 
|-id=117 bgcolor=#fefefe
| 211117 ||  || — || April 10, 2002 || Socorro || LINEAR || PHO || align=right | 1.8 km || 
|-id=118 bgcolor=#fefefe
| 211118 ||  || — || April 15, 2002 || Socorro || LINEAR || FLO || align=right | 1.9 km || 
|-id=119 bgcolor=#d6d6d6
| 211119 ||  || — || April 1, 2002 || Palomar || NEAT || EOS || align=right | 3.0 km || 
|-id=120 bgcolor=#fefefe
| 211120 ||  || — || April 1, 2002 || Palomar || NEAT || V || align=right data-sort-value="0.90" | 900 m || 
|-id=121 bgcolor=#fefefe
| 211121 ||  || — || April 2, 2002 || Palomar || NEAT || — || align=right | 1.0 km || 
|-id=122 bgcolor=#fefefe
| 211122 ||  || — || April 2, 2002 || Palomar || NEAT || — || align=right | 1.2 km || 
|-id=123 bgcolor=#fefefe
| 211123 ||  || — || April 4, 2002 || Palomar || NEAT || — || align=right data-sort-value="0.92" | 920 m || 
|-id=124 bgcolor=#fefefe
| 211124 ||  || — || April 4, 2002 || Palomar || NEAT || V || align=right data-sort-value="0.82" | 820 m || 
|-id=125 bgcolor=#fefefe
| 211125 ||  || — || April 4, 2002 || Palomar || NEAT || — || align=right | 1.0 km || 
|-id=126 bgcolor=#fefefe
| 211126 ||  || — || April 5, 2002 || Palomar || NEAT || V || align=right data-sort-value="0.93" | 930 m || 
|-id=127 bgcolor=#fefefe
| 211127 ||  || — || April 5, 2002 || Palomar || NEAT || — || align=right | 1.5 km || 
|-id=128 bgcolor=#fefefe
| 211128 ||  || — || April 5, 2002 || Palomar || NEAT || EUT || align=right data-sort-value="0.77" | 770 m || 
|-id=129 bgcolor=#fefefe
| 211129 ||  || — || April 5, 2002 || Anderson Mesa || LONEOS || — || align=right | 2.1 km || 
|-id=130 bgcolor=#fefefe
| 211130 ||  || — || April 5, 2002 || Anderson Mesa || LONEOS || FLO || align=right | 1.1 km || 
|-id=131 bgcolor=#fefefe
| 211131 ||  || — || April 8, 2002 || Palomar || NEAT || NYS || align=right | 2.6 km || 
|-id=132 bgcolor=#fefefe
| 211132 ||  || — || April 9, 2002 || Kitt Peak || Spacewatch || — || align=right | 1.2 km || 
|-id=133 bgcolor=#fefefe
| 211133 ||  || — || April 9, 2002 || Kitt Peak || Spacewatch || — || align=right | 1.0 km || 
|-id=134 bgcolor=#fefefe
| 211134 ||  || — || April 10, 2002 || Socorro || LINEAR || — || align=right | 1.4 km || 
|-id=135 bgcolor=#fefefe
| 211135 ||  || — || April 10, 2002 || Socorro || LINEAR || NYS || align=right | 2.4 km || 
|-id=136 bgcolor=#fefefe
| 211136 ||  || — || April 10, 2002 || Socorro || LINEAR || — || align=right | 1.5 km || 
|-id=137 bgcolor=#fefefe
| 211137 ||  || — || April 10, 2002 || Socorro || LINEAR || — || align=right | 1.5 km || 
|-id=138 bgcolor=#fefefe
| 211138 ||  || — || April 8, 2002 || Kitt Peak || Spacewatch || — || align=right | 1.6 km || 
|-id=139 bgcolor=#fefefe
| 211139 ||  || — || April 8, 2002 || Palomar || NEAT || V || align=right data-sort-value="0.89" | 890 m || 
|-id=140 bgcolor=#fefefe
| 211140 ||  || — || April 9, 2002 || Socorro || LINEAR || — || align=right | 1.2 km || 
|-id=141 bgcolor=#fefefe
| 211141 ||  || — || April 9, 2002 || Socorro || LINEAR || NYS || align=right | 1.1 km || 
|-id=142 bgcolor=#fefefe
| 211142 ||  || — || April 9, 2002 || Socorro || LINEAR || V || align=right | 1.2 km || 
|-id=143 bgcolor=#fefefe
| 211143 ||  || — || April 10, 2002 || Socorro || LINEAR || — || align=right | 1.1 km || 
|-id=144 bgcolor=#fefefe
| 211144 ||  || — || April 10, 2002 || Socorro || LINEAR || — || align=right | 2.6 km || 
|-id=145 bgcolor=#fefefe
| 211145 ||  || — || April 11, 2002 || Anderson Mesa || LONEOS || — || align=right | 1.8 km || 
|-id=146 bgcolor=#fefefe
| 211146 ||  || — || April 11, 2002 || Anderson Mesa || LONEOS || V || align=right data-sort-value="0.95" | 950 m || 
|-id=147 bgcolor=#fefefe
| 211147 ||  || — || April 11, 2002 || Socorro || LINEAR || — || align=right | 1.3 km || 
|-id=148 bgcolor=#fefefe
| 211148 ||  || — || April 11, 2002 || Socorro || LINEAR || — || align=right | 1.0 km || 
|-id=149 bgcolor=#fefefe
| 211149 ||  || — || April 12, 2002 || Socorro || LINEAR || — || align=right | 1.4 km || 
|-id=150 bgcolor=#fefefe
| 211150 ||  || — || April 12, 2002 || Kitt Peak || Spacewatch || MAS || align=right data-sort-value="0.78" | 780 m || 
|-id=151 bgcolor=#fefefe
| 211151 ||  || — || April 13, 2002 || Palomar || NEAT || NYS || align=right | 2.2 km || 
|-id=152 bgcolor=#fefefe
| 211152 ||  || — || April 12, 2002 || Palomar || NEAT || FLO || align=right | 1.0 km || 
|-id=153 bgcolor=#fefefe
| 211153 ||  || — || April 12, 2002 || Palomar || NEAT || — || align=right | 1.3 km || 
|-id=154 bgcolor=#fefefe
| 211154 ||  || — || April 13, 2002 || Palomar || NEAT || V || align=right | 1.1 km || 
|-id=155 bgcolor=#fefefe
| 211155 ||  || — || April 14, 2002 || Palomar || NEAT || NYS || align=right data-sort-value="0.92" | 920 m || 
|-id=156 bgcolor=#fefefe
| 211156 ||  || — || April 14, 2002 || Palomar || NEAT || — || align=right | 1.0 km || 
|-id=157 bgcolor=#fefefe
| 211157 ||  || — || April 15, 2002 || Palomar || NEAT || NYS || align=right | 2.1 km || 
|-id=158 bgcolor=#fefefe
| 211158 ||  || — || April 9, 2002 || Socorro || LINEAR || — || align=right | 1.1 km || 
|-id=159 bgcolor=#fefefe
| 211159 ||  || — || April 10, 2002 || Socorro || LINEAR || NYS || align=right data-sort-value="0.79" | 790 m || 
|-id=160 bgcolor=#fefefe
| 211160 ||  || — || April 10, 2002 || Socorro || LINEAR || — || align=right | 1.3 km || 
|-id=161 bgcolor=#fefefe
| 211161 ||  || — || April 13, 2002 || Palomar || NEAT || — || align=right | 1.4 km || 
|-id=162 bgcolor=#fefefe
| 211162 ||  || — || April 14, 2002 || Socorro || LINEAR || — || align=right | 1.2 km || 
|-id=163 bgcolor=#fefefe
| 211163 ||  || — || April 4, 2002 || Haleakala || NEAT || NYS || align=right data-sort-value="0.85" | 850 m || 
|-id=164 bgcolor=#fefefe
| 211164 || 2002 HT || — || April 16, 2002 || Desert Eagle || W. K. Y. Yeung || — || align=right | 1.7 km || 
|-id=165 bgcolor=#fefefe
| 211165 ||  || — || April 16, 2002 || Socorro || LINEAR || — || align=right | 1.2 km || 
|-id=166 bgcolor=#fefefe
| 211166 ||  || — || April 18, 2002 || Desert Eagle || W. K. Y. Yeung || NYS || align=right | 1.1 km || 
|-id=167 bgcolor=#fefefe
| 211167 ||  || — || April 21, 2002 || Kitt Peak || Spacewatch || — || align=right | 1.2 km || 
|-id=168 bgcolor=#fefefe
| 211168 ||  || — || April 17, 2002 || Socorro || LINEAR || — || align=right | 1.3 km || 
|-id=169 bgcolor=#fefefe
| 211169 || 2002 JT || — || May 3, 2002 || Desert Eagle || W. K. Y. Yeung || — || align=right | 1.1 km || 
|-id=170 bgcolor=#fefefe
| 211170 ||  || — || May 4, 2002 || Desert Eagle || W. K. Y. Yeung || — || align=right | 1.2 km || 
|-id=171 bgcolor=#fefefe
| 211171 ||  || — || May 4, 2002 || Socorro || LINEAR || PHO || align=right | 1.2 km || 
|-id=172 bgcolor=#fefefe
| 211172 Tarantola ||  ||  || May 2, 2002 || Needville || J. Dellinger, P. Sava || — || align=right data-sort-value="0.97" | 970 m || 
|-id=173 bgcolor=#fefefe
| 211173 ||  || — || May 8, 2002 || Socorro || LINEAR || NYS || align=right | 1.2 km || 
|-id=174 bgcolor=#fefefe
| 211174 ||  || — || May 7, 2002 || Palomar || NEAT || — || align=right | 1.6 km || 
|-id=175 bgcolor=#fefefe
| 211175 ||  || — || May 8, 2002 || Socorro || LINEAR || — || align=right | 1.2 km || 
|-id=176 bgcolor=#fefefe
| 211176 ||  || — || May 9, 2002 || Socorro || LINEAR || NYS || align=right data-sort-value="0.89" | 890 m || 
|-id=177 bgcolor=#fefefe
| 211177 ||  || — || May 9, 2002 || Socorro || LINEAR || — || align=right | 1.2 km || 
|-id=178 bgcolor=#fefefe
| 211178 ||  || — || May 8, 2002 || Socorro || LINEAR || — || align=right | 1.3 km || 
|-id=179 bgcolor=#fefefe
| 211179 ||  || — || May 11, 2002 || Socorro || LINEAR || — || align=right | 1.6 km || 
|-id=180 bgcolor=#fefefe
| 211180 ||  || — || May 11, 2002 || Socorro || LINEAR || V || align=right | 1.2 km || 
|-id=181 bgcolor=#fefefe
| 211181 ||  || — || May 11, 2002 || Socorro || LINEAR || V || align=right | 1.00 km || 
|-id=182 bgcolor=#fefefe
| 211182 ||  || — || May 11, 2002 || Socorro || LINEAR || — || align=right | 1.1 km || 
|-id=183 bgcolor=#fefefe
| 211183 ||  || — || May 15, 2002 || Palomar || NEAT || — || align=right | 1.6 km || 
|-id=184 bgcolor=#fefefe
| 211184 ||  || — || May 15, 2002 || Palomar || NEAT || PHO || align=right | 1.4 km || 
|-id=185 bgcolor=#fefefe
| 211185 ||  || — || May 13, 2002 || Socorro || LINEAR || — || align=right | 1.3 km || 
|-id=186 bgcolor=#fefefe
| 211186 ||  || — || May 8, 2002 || Socorro || LINEAR || — || align=right | 1.1 km || 
|-id=187 bgcolor=#fefefe
| 211187 ||  || — || May 8, 2002 || Socorro || LINEAR || — || align=right | 1.0 km || 
|-id=188 bgcolor=#fefefe
| 211188 ||  || — || May 16, 2002 || Haleakala || NEAT || PHO || align=right | 1.4 km || 
|-id=189 bgcolor=#fefefe
| 211189 ||  || — || May 17, 2002 || Palomar || NEAT || — || align=right | 1.3 km || 
|-id=190 bgcolor=#fefefe
| 211190 ||  || — || May 18, 2002 || Palomar || NEAT || MAS || align=right | 1.1 km || 
|-id=191 bgcolor=#fefefe
| 211191 ||  || — || June 5, 2002 || Socorro || LINEAR || — || align=right | 1.5 km || 
|-id=192 bgcolor=#fefefe
| 211192 ||  || — || June 5, 2002 || Socorro || LINEAR || — || align=right | 2.7 km || 
|-id=193 bgcolor=#fefefe
| 211193 ||  || — || June 6, 2002 || Socorro || LINEAR || — || align=right data-sort-value="0.99" | 990 m || 
|-id=194 bgcolor=#fefefe
| 211194 ||  || — || June 10, 2002 || Palomar || NEAT || — || align=right | 1.3 km || 
|-id=195 bgcolor=#fefefe
| 211195 ||  || — || June 11, 2002 || Socorro || LINEAR || — || align=right | 1.7 km || 
|-id=196 bgcolor=#fefefe
| 211196 ||  || — || June 13, 2002 || Palomar || NEAT || — || align=right | 3.5 km || 
|-id=197 bgcolor=#fefefe
| 211197 ||  || — || June 8, 2002 || Socorro || LINEAR || FLO || align=right | 1.1 km || 
|-id=198 bgcolor=#fefefe
| 211198 ||  || — || June 15, 2002 || Palomar || NEAT || NYS || align=right | 1.0 km || 
|-id=199 bgcolor=#fefefe
| 211199 ||  || — || July 12, 2002 || Reedy Creek || J. Broughton || — || align=right | 1.5 km || 
|-id=200 bgcolor=#E9E9E9
| 211200 ||  || — || July 13, 2002 || Palomar || NEAT || — || align=right | 2.9 km || 
|}

211201–211300 

|-bgcolor=#fefefe
| 211201 ||  || — || July 12, 2002 || Palomar || NEAT || NYS || align=right data-sort-value="0.92" | 920 m || 
|-id=202 bgcolor=#E9E9E9
| 211202 ||  || — || July 12, 2002 || Palomar || NEAT || — || align=right | 1.3 km || 
|-id=203 bgcolor=#fefefe
| 211203 ||  || — || July 14, 2002 || Palomar || NEAT || MAS || align=right | 1.1 km || 
|-id=204 bgcolor=#E9E9E9
| 211204 ||  || — || July 8, 2002 || Palomar || NEAT || — || align=right | 1.5 km || 
|-id=205 bgcolor=#E9E9E9
| 211205 ||  || — || July 18, 2002 || Palomar || NEAT || — || align=right | 4.6 km || 
|-id=206 bgcolor=#FA8072
| 211206 ||  || — || July 19, 2002 || Palomar || NEAT || — || align=right | 1.1 km || 
|-id=207 bgcolor=#fefefe
| 211207 ||  || — || July 22, 2002 || Palomar || NEAT || — || align=right data-sort-value="0.95" | 950 m || 
|-id=208 bgcolor=#E9E9E9
| 211208 ||  || — || July 17, 2002 || Palomar || NEAT || — || align=right | 1.5 km || 
|-id=209 bgcolor=#E9E9E9
| 211209 ||  || — || July 18, 2002 || Palomar || NEAT || AST || align=right | 2.3 km || 
|-id=210 bgcolor=#E9E9E9
| 211210 ||  || — || August 3, 2002 || Palomar || NEAT || MAR || align=right | 2.0 km || 
|-id=211 bgcolor=#E9E9E9
| 211211 ||  || — || August 5, 2002 || Gnosca || S. Sposetti || JUN || align=right | 2.2 km || 
|-id=212 bgcolor=#fefefe
| 211212 ||  || — || August 6, 2002 || Palomar || NEAT || — || align=right | 1.0 km || 
|-id=213 bgcolor=#E9E9E9
| 211213 ||  || — || August 6, 2002 || Campo Imperatore || CINEOS || MAR || align=right | 1.4 km || 
|-id=214 bgcolor=#E9E9E9
| 211214 ||  || — || August 4, 2002 || Socorro || LINEAR || BAR || align=right | 2.8 km || 
|-id=215 bgcolor=#fefefe
| 211215 ||  || — || August 7, 2002 || Palomar || NEAT || NYS || align=right data-sort-value="0.90" | 900 m || 
|-id=216 bgcolor=#fefefe
| 211216 ||  || — || August 8, 2002 || Palomar || NEAT || NYS || align=right data-sort-value="0.99" | 990 m || 
|-id=217 bgcolor=#E9E9E9
| 211217 ||  || — || August 2, 2002 || Campo Imperatore || CINEOS || — || align=right | 2.1 km || 
|-id=218 bgcolor=#fefefe
| 211218 ||  || — || August 5, 2002 || Palomar || NEAT || — || align=right | 1.0 km || 
|-id=219 bgcolor=#E9E9E9
| 211219 ||  || — || August 11, 2002 || Palomar || NEAT || — || align=right | 2.9 km || 
|-id=220 bgcolor=#fefefe
| 211220 ||  || — || August 13, 2002 || Socorro || LINEAR || NYS || align=right | 1.1 km || 
|-id=221 bgcolor=#E9E9E9
| 211221 ||  || — || August 13, 2002 || Socorro || LINEAR || — || align=right | 2.8 km || 
|-id=222 bgcolor=#FA8072
| 211222 ||  || — || August 14, 2002 || Socorro || LINEAR || H || align=right | 1.0 km || 
|-id=223 bgcolor=#fefefe
| 211223 ||  || — || August 11, 2002 || Socorro || LINEAR || — || align=right | 1.1 km || 
|-id=224 bgcolor=#fefefe
| 211224 ||  || — || August 14, 2002 || Socorro || LINEAR || NYS || align=right | 1.0 km || 
|-id=225 bgcolor=#fefefe
| 211225 ||  || — || August 14, 2002 || Socorro || LINEAR || NYS || align=right | 1.2 km || 
|-id=226 bgcolor=#E9E9E9
| 211226 ||  || — || August 14, 2002 || Socorro || LINEAR || — || align=right | 1.7 km || 
|-id=227 bgcolor=#fefefe
| 211227 ||  || — || August 12, 2002 || Socorro || LINEAR || — || align=right | 1.7 km || 
|-id=228 bgcolor=#E9E9E9
| 211228 ||  || — || August 12, 2002 || Socorro || LINEAR || EUN || align=right | 1.3 km || 
|-id=229 bgcolor=#E9E9E9
| 211229 ||  || — || August 15, 2002 || Kitt Peak || Spacewatch || — || align=right | 2.7 km || 
|-id=230 bgcolor=#fefefe
| 211230 ||  || — || August 14, 2002 || Socorro || LINEAR || NYS || align=right | 1.0 km || 
|-id=231 bgcolor=#E9E9E9
| 211231 ||  || — || August 12, 2002 || Haleakala || NEAT || — || align=right | 3.8 km || 
|-id=232 bgcolor=#E9E9E9
| 211232 ||  || — || August 9, 2002 || Cerro Tololo || M. W. Buie || — || align=right | 1.4 km || 
|-id=233 bgcolor=#E9E9E9
| 211233 ||  || — || August 8, 2002 || Palomar || S. F. Hönig || — || align=right | 1.7 km || 
|-id=234 bgcolor=#fefefe
| 211234 ||  || — || August 13, 2002 || Nanchuan || Q.-z. Ye || V || align=right data-sort-value="0.93" | 930 m || 
|-id=235 bgcolor=#E9E9E9
| 211235 ||  || — || August 8, 2002 || Palomar || NEAT || — || align=right | 1.4 km || 
|-id=236 bgcolor=#E9E9E9
| 211236 ||  || — || August 13, 2002 || Anderson Mesa || LONEOS || — || align=right | 1.9 km || 
|-id=237 bgcolor=#fefefe
| 211237 ||  || — || August 11, 2002 || Haleakala || NEAT || NYS || align=right data-sort-value="0.96" | 960 m || 
|-id=238 bgcolor=#E9E9E9
| 211238 ||  || — || August 4, 2002 || Palomar || NEAT || — || align=right | 1.8 km || 
|-id=239 bgcolor=#E9E9E9
| 211239 ||  || — || August 16, 2002 || Haleakala || NEAT || — || align=right | 1.6 km || 
|-id=240 bgcolor=#E9E9E9
| 211240 ||  || — || August 16, 2002 || Palomar || NEAT || — || align=right | 1.3 km || 
|-id=241 bgcolor=#fefefe
| 211241 ||  || — || August 27, 2002 || Palomar || NEAT || H || align=right | 1.1 km || 
|-id=242 bgcolor=#E9E9E9
| 211242 ||  || — || August 28, 2002 || Palomar || NEAT || PAD || align=right | 4.0 km || 
|-id=243 bgcolor=#E9E9E9
| 211243 ||  || — || August 29, 2002 || Palomar || NEAT || — || align=right | 2.5 km || 
|-id=244 bgcolor=#E9E9E9
| 211244 ||  || — || August 29, 2002 || Palomar || NEAT || — || align=right | 1.6 km || 
|-id=245 bgcolor=#E9E9E9
| 211245 ||  || — || August 28, 2002 || Palomar || R. Matson || — || align=right | 5.1 km || 
|-id=246 bgcolor=#E9E9E9
| 211246 ||  || — || August 17, 2002 || Palomar || A. Lowe || EUN || align=right | 1.8 km || 
|-id=247 bgcolor=#E9E9E9
| 211247 ||  || — || August 28, 2002 || Palomar || NEAT || — || align=right | 2.9 km || 
|-id=248 bgcolor=#E9E9E9
| 211248 ||  || — || August 20, 2002 || Palomar || NEAT || — || align=right | 1.3 km || 
|-id=249 bgcolor=#E9E9E9
| 211249 ||  || — || August 17, 2002 || Palomar || NEAT || — || align=right | 1.4 km || 
|-id=250 bgcolor=#E9E9E9
| 211250 ||  || — || August 27, 2002 || Palomar || NEAT || — || align=right | 2.0 km || 
|-id=251 bgcolor=#d6d6d6
| 211251 ||  || — || August 27, 2002 || Palomar || NEAT || EOS || align=right | 2.7 km || 
|-id=252 bgcolor=#E9E9E9
| 211252 ||  || — || August 19, 2002 || Palomar || NEAT || — || align=right | 1.3 km || 
|-id=253 bgcolor=#E9E9E9
| 211253 ||  || — || August 29, 2002 || Palomar || NEAT || — || align=right | 1.1 km || 
|-id=254 bgcolor=#E9E9E9
| 211254 ||  || — || August 29, 2002 || Palomar || NEAT || — || align=right | 2.6 km || 
|-id=255 bgcolor=#fefefe
| 211255 ||  || — || August 29, 2002 || Palomar || NEAT || NYS || align=right | 2.1 km || 
|-id=256 bgcolor=#fefefe
| 211256 ||  || — || August 30, 2002 || Palomar || NEAT || MAS || align=right data-sort-value="0.75" | 750 m || 
|-id=257 bgcolor=#E9E9E9
| 211257 || 2002 RJ || — || September 1, 2002 || Kvistaberg || UDAS || — || align=right | 2.7 km || 
|-id=258 bgcolor=#E9E9E9
| 211258 ||  || — || September 4, 2002 || Anderson Mesa || LONEOS || ADE || align=right | 3.1 km || 
|-id=259 bgcolor=#E9E9E9
| 211259 ||  || — || September 4, 2002 || Anderson Mesa || LONEOS || — || align=right | 2.9 km || 
|-id=260 bgcolor=#E9E9E9
| 211260 ||  || — || September 4, 2002 || Anderson Mesa || LONEOS || — || align=right | 3.2 km || 
|-id=261 bgcolor=#fefefe
| 211261 ||  || — || September 4, 2002 || Anderson Mesa || LONEOS || H || align=right | 1.2 km || 
|-id=262 bgcolor=#d6d6d6
| 211262 ||  || — || September 5, 2002 || Anderson Mesa || LONEOS || — || align=right | 4.6 km || 
|-id=263 bgcolor=#E9E9E9
| 211263 ||  || — || September 5, 2002 || Socorro || LINEAR || — || align=right | 2.1 km || 
|-id=264 bgcolor=#E9E9E9
| 211264 ||  || — || September 5, 2002 || Socorro || LINEAR || GAL || align=right | 3.0 km || 
|-id=265 bgcolor=#E9E9E9
| 211265 ||  || — || September 5, 2002 || Socorro || LINEAR || 526 || align=right | 4.2 km || 
|-id=266 bgcolor=#fefefe
| 211266 ||  || — || September 5, 2002 || Socorro || LINEAR || H || align=right data-sort-value="0.68" | 680 m || 
|-id=267 bgcolor=#E9E9E9
| 211267 ||  || — || September 4, 2002 || Anderson Mesa || LONEOS || — || align=right | 3.1 km || 
|-id=268 bgcolor=#E9E9E9
| 211268 ||  || — || September 5, 2002 || Socorro || LINEAR || — || align=right | 1.7 km || 
|-id=269 bgcolor=#E9E9E9
| 211269 ||  || — || September 5, 2002 || Socorro || LINEAR || — || align=right | 2.2 km || 
|-id=270 bgcolor=#E9E9E9
| 211270 ||  || — || September 5, 2002 || Socorro || LINEAR || — || align=right | 2.3 km || 
|-id=271 bgcolor=#E9E9E9
| 211271 ||  || — || September 5, 2002 || Socorro || LINEAR || — || align=right | 2.8 km || 
|-id=272 bgcolor=#E9E9E9
| 211272 ||  || — || September 5, 2002 || Socorro || LINEAR || — || align=right | 3.8 km || 
|-id=273 bgcolor=#E9E9E9
| 211273 ||  || — || September 5, 2002 || Socorro || LINEAR || — || align=right | 3.5 km || 
|-id=274 bgcolor=#E9E9E9
| 211274 ||  || — || September 5, 2002 || Socorro || LINEAR || — || align=right | 3.8 km || 
|-id=275 bgcolor=#fefefe
| 211275 ||  || — || September 5, 2002 || Socorro || LINEAR || H || align=right data-sort-value="0.76" | 760 m || 
|-id=276 bgcolor=#fefefe
| 211276 ||  || — || September 6, 2002 || Socorro || LINEAR || — || align=right | 1.4 km || 
|-id=277 bgcolor=#E9E9E9
| 211277 ||  || — || September 10, 2002 || Palomar || NEAT || — || align=right | 2.7 km || 
|-id=278 bgcolor=#fefefe
| 211278 ||  || — || September 11, 2002 || Palomar || NEAT || H || align=right data-sort-value="0.93" | 930 m || 
|-id=279 bgcolor=#FA8072
| 211279 ||  || — || September 13, 2002 || Socorro || LINEAR || H || align=right | 1.2 km || 
|-id=280 bgcolor=#E9E9E9
| 211280 ||  || — || September 11, 2002 || Palomar || NEAT || — || align=right | 2.1 km || 
|-id=281 bgcolor=#E9E9E9
| 211281 ||  || — || September 11, 2002 || Palomar || NEAT || — || align=right | 1.8 km || 
|-id=282 bgcolor=#E9E9E9
| 211282 ||  || — || September 12, 2002 || Palomar || NEAT || — || align=right | 3.6 km || 
|-id=283 bgcolor=#E9E9E9
| 211283 ||  || — || September 12, 2002 || Palomar || NEAT || — || align=right | 3.9 km || 
|-id=284 bgcolor=#E9E9E9
| 211284 ||  || — || September 13, 2002 || Kitt Peak || Spacewatch || — || align=right | 1.4 km || 
|-id=285 bgcolor=#E9E9E9
| 211285 ||  || — || September 11, 2002 || Palomar || NEAT || — || align=right | 2.0 km || 
|-id=286 bgcolor=#E9E9E9
| 211286 ||  || — || September 11, 2002 || Palomar || NEAT || — || align=right | 1.7 km || 
|-id=287 bgcolor=#E9E9E9
| 211287 ||  || — || September 11, 2002 || Palomar || NEAT || — || align=right | 2.3 km || 
|-id=288 bgcolor=#E9E9E9
| 211288 ||  || — || September 12, 2002 || Palomar || NEAT || — || align=right | 2.5 km || 
|-id=289 bgcolor=#E9E9E9
| 211289 ||  || — || September 12, 2002 || Palomar || NEAT || PAD || align=right | 2.3 km || 
|-id=290 bgcolor=#E9E9E9
| 211290 ||  || — || September 12, 2002 || Palomar || NEAT || — || align=right | 2.3 km || 
|-id=291 bgcolor=#E9E9E9
| 211291 ||  || — || September 13, 2002 || Palomar || NEAT || — || align=right | 2.8 km || 
|-id=292 bgcolor=#E9E9E9
| 211292 ||  || — || September 14, 2002 || Palomar || NEAT || — || align=right | 2.5 km || 
|-id=293 bgcolor=#E9E9E9
| 211293 ||  || — || September 13, 2002 || Palomar || NEAT || — || align=right | 1.6 km || 
|-id=294 bgcolor=#E9E9E9
| 211294 ||  || — || September 13, 2002 || Palomar || NEAT || — || align=right | 2.6 km || 
|-id=295 bgcolor=#E9E9E9
| 211295 ||  || — || September 13, 2002 || Haleakala || NEAT || — || align=right | 3.1 km || 
|-id=296 bgcolor=#fefefe
| 211296 ||  || — || September 15, 2002 || Palomar || NEAT || — || align=right | 1.1 km || 
|-id=297 bgcolor=#E9E9E9
| 211297 ||  || — || September 15, 2002 || Palomar || NEAT || — || align=right | 1.9 km || 
|-id=298 bgcolor=#E9E9E9
| 211298 ||  || — || September 14, 2002 || Palomar || NEAT || MAR || align=right | 1.4 km || 
|-id=299 bgcolor=#E9E9E9
| 211299 ||  || — || September 15, 2002 || Palomar || R. Matson || — || align=right | 1.9 km || 
|-id=300 bgcolor=#E9E9E9
| 211300 ||  || — || September 4, 2002 || Palomar || NEAT || — || align=right | 1.8 km || 
|}

211301–211400 

|-bgcolor=#E9E9E9
| 211301 ||  || — || September 14, 2002 || Palomar || NEAT || — || align=right | 1.7 km || 
|-id=302 bgcolor=#E9E9E9
| 211302 ||  || — || September 15, 2002 || Palomar || NEAT || NEM || align=right | 2.4 km || 
|-id=303 bgcolor=#E9E9E9
| 211303 || 2002 SK || — || September 17, 2002 || Haleakala || NEAT || ADE || align=right | 4.1 km || 
|-id=304 bgcolor=#E9E9E9
| 211304 ||  || — || September 26, 2002 || Palomar || NEAT || — || align=right | 1.3 km || 
|-id=305 bgcolor=#E9E9E9
| 211305 ||  || — || September 27, 2002 || Palomar || NEAT || — || align=right | 2.2 km || 
|-id=306 bgcolor=#E9E9E9
| 211306 ||  || — || September 28, 2002 || Powell || Powell Obs. || JUN || align=right | 1.7 km || 
|-id=307 bgcolor=#E9E9E9
| 211307 ||  || — || September 26, 2002 || Palomar || NEAT || — || align=right | 2.9 km || 
|-id=308 bgcolor=#E9E9E9
| 211308 ||  || — || September 28, 2002 || Palomar || NEAT || — || align=right | 3.0 km || 
|-id=309 bgcolor=#E9E9E9
| 211309 ||  || — || September 28, 2002 || Haleakala || NEAT || — || align=right | 1.5 km || 
|-id=310 bgcolor=#E9E9E9
| 211310 ||  || — || September 28, 2002 || Haleakala || NEAT || GEF || align=right | 2.2 km || 
|-id=311 bgcolor=#fefefe
| 211311 ||  || — || September 29, 2002 || Haleakala || NEAT || V || align=right | 1.0 km || 
|-id=312 bgcolor=#E9E9E9
| 211312 ||  || — || September 29, 2002 || Haleakala || NEAT || — || align=right | 4.0 km || 
|-id=313 bgcolor=#fefefe
| 211313 ||  || — || September 30, 2002 || Socorro || LINEAR || H || align=right | 1.2 km || 
|-id=314 bgcolor=#E9E9E9
| 211314 ||  || — || September 30, 2002 || Socorro || LINEAR || — || align=right | 1.6 km || 
|-id=315 bgcolor=#E9E9E9
| 211315 ||  || — || September 30, 2002 || Haleakala || NEAT || — || align=right | 4.8 km || 
|-id=316 bgcolor=#fefefe
| 211316 ||  || — || September 29, 2002 || Haleakala || NEAT || H || align=right data-sort-value="0.87" | 870 m || 
|-id=317 bgcolor=#E9E9E9
| 211317 ||  || — || September 28, 2002 || Palomar || NEAT || — || align=right | 3.4 km || 
|-id=318 bgcolor=#fefefe
| 211318 ||  || — || September 30, 2002 || Haleakala || NEAT || NYS || align=right | 1.0 km || 
|-id=319 bgcolor=#E9E9E9
| 211319 ||  || — || September 20, 2002 || Palomar || NEAT || — || align=right | 4.8 km || 
|-id=320 bgcolor=#E9E9E9
| 211320 ||  || — || September 30, 2002 || Socorro || LINEAR || — || align=right | 2.1 km || 
|-id=321 bgcolor=#E9E9E9
| 211321 ||  || — || September 30, 2002 || Haleakala || NEAT || AER || align=right | 2.2 km || 
|-id=322 bgcolor=#E9E9E9
| 211322 ||  || — || September 30, 2002 || Socorro || LINEAR || — || align=right | 1.2 km || 
|-id=323 bgcolor=#d6d6d6
| 211323 ||  || — || September 28, 2002 || Kingsnake || J. V. McClusky || FIR || align=right | 4.8 km || 
|-id=324 bgcolor=#E9E9E9
| 211324 ||  || — || September 16, 2002 || Palomar || NEAT || RAF || align=right | 1.1 km || 
|-id=325 bgcolor=#E9E9E9
| 211325 ||  || — || September 16, 2002 || Palomar || R. Matson || — || align=right | 2.0 km || 
|-id=326 bgcolor=#E9E9E9
| 211326 ||  || — || September 16, 2002 || Palomar || NEAT || — || align=right | 1.7 km || 
|-id=327 bgcolor=#E9E9E9
| 211327 ||  || — || September 16, 2002 || Palomar || NEAT || — || align=right | 2.0 km || 
|-id=328 bgcolor=#E9E9E9
| 211328 ||  || — || October 1, 2002 || Anderson Mesa || LONEOS || — || align=right | 3.1 km || 
|-id=329 bgcolor=#E9E9E9
| 211329 ||  || — || October 1, 2002 || Haleakala || NEAT || — || align=right | 1.8 km || 
|-id=330 bgcolor=#E9E9E9
| 211330 ||  || — || October 2, 2002 || Haleakala || NEAT || INO || align=right | 1.9 km || 
|-id=331 bgcolor=#E9E9E9
| 211331 ||  || — || October 2, 2002 || Socorro || LINEAR || — || align=right | 2.0 km || 
|-id=332 bgcolor=#E9E9E9
| 211332 ||  || — || October 2, 2002 || Socorro || LINEAR || — || align=right | 2.7 km || 
|-id=333 bgcolor=#E9E9E9
| 211333 ||  || — || October 2, 2002 || Socorro || LINEAR || — || align=right | 2.8 km || 
|-id=334 bgcolor=#E9E9E9
| 211334 ||  || — || October 2, 2002 || Socorro || LINEAR || — || align=right | 2.1 km || 
|-id=335 bgcolor=#E9E9E9
| 211335 ||  || — || October 2, 2002 || Socorro || LINEAR || — || align=right | 2.3 km || 
|-id=336 bgcolor=#E9E9E9
| 211336 ||  || — || October 2, 2002 || Socorro || LINEAR || — || align=right | 4.7 km || 
|-id=337 bgcolor=#E9E9E9
| 211337 ||  || — || October 2, 2002 || Socorro || LINEAR || — || align=right | 1.0 km || 
|-id=338 bgcolor=#E9E9E9
| 211338 ||  || — || October 2, 2002 || Socorro || LINEAR || EUN || align=right | 2.0 km || 
|-id=339 bgcolor=#E9E9E9
| 211339 ||  || — || October 2, 2002 || Socorro || LINEAR || — || align=right | 1.5 km || 
|-id=340 bgcolor=#E9E9E9
| 211340 ||  || — || October 2, 2002 || Socorro || LINEAR || — || align=right | 2.3 km || 
|-id=341 bgcolor=#fefefe
| 211341 ||  || — || October 2, 2002 || Socorro || LINEAR || H || align=right data-sort-value="0.98" | 980 m || 
|-id=342 bgcolor=#fefefe
| 211342 ||  || — || October 4, 2002 || Palomar || NEAT || H || align=right data-sort-value="0.77" | 770 m || 
|-id=343 bgcolor=#E9E9E9
| 211343 Dieterhusar ||  ||  || October 8, 2002 || Michael Adrian || M. Kretlow || — || align=right | 1.9 km || 
|-id=344 bgcolor=#E9E9E9
| 211344 ||  || — || October 7, 2002 || Haleakala || NEAT || — || align=right | 5.3 km || 
|-id=345 bgcolor=#E9E9E9
| 211345 ||  || — || October 1, 2002 || Socorro || LINEAR || — || align=right | 2.3 km || 
|-id=346 bgcolor=#E9E9E9
| 211346 ||  || — || October 3, 2002 || Socorro || LINEAR || AEO || align=right | 1.5 km || 
|-id=347 bgcolor=#d6d6d6
| 211347 ||  || — || October 3, 2002 || Socorro || LINEAR || CHA || align=right | 2.5 km || 
|-id=348 bgcolor=#E9E9E9
| 211348 ||  || — || October 2, 2002 || Haleakala || NEAT || — || align=right | 2.3 km || 
|-id=349 bgcolor=#E9E9E9
| 211349 ||  || — || October 3, 2002 || Palomar || NEAT || — || align=right | 2.3 km || 
|-id=350 bgcolor=#E9E9E9
| 211350 ||  || — || October 4, 2002 || Socorro || LINEAR || — || align=right | 2.8 km || 
|-id=351 bgcolor=#E9E9E9
| 211351 ||  || — || October 4, 2002 || Palomar || NEAT || MAR || align=right | 2.0 km || 
|-id=352 bgcolor=#E9E9E9
| 211352 ||  || — || October 3, 2002 || Socorro || LINEAR || — || align=right | 2.5 km || 
|-id=353 bgcolor=#E9E9E9
| 211353 ||  || — || October 5, 2002 || Palomar || NEAT || — || align=right | 2.3 km || 
|-id=354 bgcolor=#E9E9E9
| 211354 ||  || — || October 5, 2002 || Palomar || NEAT || EUN || align=right | 2.2 km || 
|-id=355 bgcolor=#E9E9E9
| 211355 ||  || — || October 2, 2002 || Haleakala || NEAT || DOR || align=right | 5.6 km || 
|-id=356 bgcolor=#E9E9E9
| 211356 ||  || — || October 3, 2002 || Palomar || NEAT || — || align=right | 4.0 km || 
|-id=357 bgcolor=#E9E9E9
| 211357 ||  || — || October 3, 2002 || Palomar || NEAT || — || align=right | 2.1 km || 
|-id=358 bgcolor=#E9E9E9
| 211358 ||  || — || October 4, 2002 || Socorro || LINEAR || — || align=right | 3.5 km || 
|-id=359 bgcolor=#d6d6d6
| 211359 ||  || — || October 14, 2002 || Powell || Powell Obs. || Tj (2.88) || align=right | 6.9 km || 
|-id=360 bgcolor=#E9E9E9
| 211360 ||  || — || October 3, 2002 || Socorro || LINEAR || — || align=right | 2.7 km || 
|-id=361 bgcolor=#E9E9E9
| 211361 ||  || — || October 6, 2002 || Socorro || LINEAR || — || align=right | 4.1 km || 
|-id=362 bgcolor=#E9E9E9
| 211362 ||  || — || October 4, 2002 || Socorro || LINEAR || MRX || align=right | 1.6 km || 
|-id=363 bgcolor=#E9E9E9
| 211363 ||  || — || October 5, 2002 || Socorro || LINEAR || — || align=right | 2.6 km || 
|-id=364 bgcolor=#E9E9E9
| 211364 ||  || — || October 7, 2002 || Socorro || LINEAR || — || align=right | 3.9 km || 
|-id=365 bgcolor=#E9E9E9
| 211365 ||  || — || October 3, 2002 || Socorro || LINEAR || WIT || align=right | 1.5 km || 
|-id=366 bgcolor=#E9E9E9
| 211366 ||  || — || October 6, 2002 || Haleakala || NEAT || — || align=right | 4.3 km || 
|-id=367 bgcolor=#E9E9E9
| 211367 ||  || — || October 7, 2002 || Socorro || LINEAR || — || align=right | 3.0 km || 
|-id=368 bgcolor=#E9E9E9
| 211368 ||  || — || October 9, 2002 || Anderson Mesa || LONEOS || — || align=right | 3.3 km || 
|-id=369 bgcolor=#E9E9E9
| 211369 ||  || — || October 9, 2002 || Socorro || LINEAR || — || align=right | 3.3 km || 
|-id=370 bgcolor=#fefefe
| 211370 ||  || — || October 10, 2002 || Socorro || LINEAR || H || align=right | 1.0 km || 
|-id=371 bgcolor=#E9E9E9
| 211371 ||  || — || October 9, 2002 || Socorro || LINEAR || PAD || align=right | 3.3 km || 
|-id=372 bgcolor=#E9E9E9
| 211372 ||  || — || October 9, 2002 || Socorro || LINEAR || EUN || align=right | 2.1 km || 
|-id=373 bgcolor=#E9E9E9
| 211373 ||  || — || October 9, 2002 || Socorro || LINEAR || — || align=right | 1.5 km || 
|-id=374 bgcolor=#E9E9E9
| 211374 Anthonyrose ||  ||  || October 4, 2002 || Apache Point || SDSS || ADE || align=right | 3.6 km || 
|-id=375 bgcolor=#E9E9E9
| 211375 Jessesteed ||  ||  || October 5, 2002 || Apache Point || SDSS || HOF || align=right | 3.2 km || 
|-id=376 bgcolor=#E9E9E9
| 211376 Joethurston ||  ||  || October 5, 2002 || Apache Point || SDSS || — || align=right | 2.9 km || 
|-id=377 bgcolor=#E9E9E9
| 211377 Travisturbyfill ||  ||  || October 5, 2002 || Apache Point || SDSS || — || align=right | 1.8 km || 
|-id=378 bgcolor=#E9E9E9
| 211378 Williamwarneke ||  ||  || October 5, 2002 || Apache Point || SDSS || — || align=right | 2.0 km || 
|-id=379 bgcolor=#E9E9E9
| 211379 Claytonwhitted ||  ||  || October 5, 2002 || Apache Point || SDSS || — || align=right | 3.9 km || 
|-id=380 bgcolor=#E9E9E9
| 211380 Kevinwoyjeck ||  ||  || October 5, 2002 || Apache Point || SDSS || — || align=right | 2.6 km || 
|-id=381 bgcolor=#E9E9E9
| 211381 Garretzuppiger ||  ||  || October 5, 2002 || Apache Point || SDSS || — || align=right | 2.2 km || 
|-id=382 bgcolor=#E9E9E9
| 211382 ||  || — || October 6, 2002 || Palomar || NEAT || AST || align=right | 2.1 km || 
|-id=383 bgcolor=#E9E9E9
| 211383 ||  || — || October 9, 2002 || Palomar || NEAT || — || align=right | 2.1 km || 
|-id=384 bgcolor=#fefefe
| 211384 ||  || — || October 28, 2002 || Socorro || LINEAR || H || align=right | 1.4 km || 
|-id=385 bgcolor=#E9E9E9
| 211385 ||  || — || October 28, 2002 || Palomar || NEAT || — || align=right | 2.7 km || 
|-id=386 bgcolor=#E9E9E9
| 211386 ||  || — || October 29, 2002 || Kitt Peak || Spacewatch || EUN || align=right | 2.0 km || 
|-id=387 bgcolor=#d6d6d6
| 211387 ||  || — || October 30, 2002 || Kitt Peak || Spacewatch || — || align=right | 4.1 km || 
|-id=388 bgcolor=#E9E9E9
| 211388 ||  || — || October 31, 2002 || Palomar || NEAT || — || align=right | 2.0 km || 
|-id=389 bgcolor=#E9E9E9
| 211389 ||  || — || October 30, 2002 || Haleakala || NEAT || GEF || align=right | 1.8 km || 
|-id=390 bgcolor=#fefefe
| 211390 ||  || — || October 30, 2002 || Palomar || NEAT || H || align=right | 1.1 km || 
|-id=391 bgcolor=#E9E9E9
| 211391 ||  || — || October 31, 2002 || Palomar || NEAT || — || align=right | 2.0 km || 
|-id=392 bgcolor=#E9E9E9
| 211392 ||  || — || October 31, 2002 || Socorro || LINEAR || — || align=right | 3.6 km || 
|-id=393 bgcolor=#E9E9E9
| 211393 ||  || — || October 29, 2002 || Apache Point || SDSS || — || align=right | 3.3 km || 
|-id=394 bgcolor=#E9E9E9
| 211394 || 2002 VK || — || November 1, 2002 || Palomar || NEAT || — || align=right | 1.6 km || 
|-id=395 bgcolor=#E9E9E9
| 211395 ||  || — || November 1, 2002 || Palomar || NEAT || — || align=right | 2.3 km || 
|-id=396 bgcolor=#E9E9E9
| 211396 ||  || — || November 4, 2002 || Palomar || NEAT || HOF || align=right | 3.6 km || 
|-id=397 bgcolor=#FA8072
| 211397 ||  || — || November 5, 2002 || Socorro || LINEAR || — || align=right | 1.0 km || 
|-id=398 bgcolor=#d6d6d6
| 211398 ||  || — || November 7, 2002 || Eskridge || G. Hug || — || align=right | 3.9 km || 
|-id=399 bgcolor=#E9E9E9
| 211399 ||  || — || November 2, 2002 || Haleakala || NEAT || AGN || align=right | 1.7 km || 
|-id=400 bgcolor=#E9E9E9
| 211400 ||  || — || November 5, 2002 || Socorro || LINEAR || — || align=right | 3.5 km || 
|}

211401–211500 

|-bgcolor=#E9E9E9
| 211401 ||  || — || November 1, 2002 || Palomar || NEAT || — || align=right | 3.3 km || 
|-id=402 bgcolor=#E9E9E9
| 211402 ||  || — || November 5, 2002 || Anderson Mesa || LONEOS || NEM || align=right | 3.3 km || 
|-id=403 bgcolor=#d6d6d6
| 211403 ||  || — || November 6, 2002 || Socorro || LINEAR || — || align=right | 3.5 km || 
|-id=404 bgcolor=#E9E9E9
| 211404 ||  || — || November 6, 2002 || Haleakala || NEAT || — || align=right | 3.1 km || 
|-id=405 bgcolor=#E9E9E9
| 211405 ||  || — || November 5, 2002 || Socorro || LINEAR || — || align=right | 2.4 km || 
|-id=406 bgcolor=#E9E9E9
| 211406 ||  || — || November 7, 2002 || Socorro || LINEAR || — || align=right | 3.2 km || 
|-id=407 bgcolor=#E9E9E9
| 211407 ||  || — || November 7, 2002 || Socorro || LINEAR || — || align=right | 3.0 km || 
|-id=408 bgcolor=#E9E9E9
| 211408 ||  || — || November 8, 2002 || Socorro || LINEAR || NEM || align=right | 2.9 km || 
|-id=409 bgcolor=#E9E9E9
| 211409 ||  || — || November 8, 2002 || Socorro || LINEAR || — || align=right | 3.7 km || 
|-id=410 bgcolor=#E9E9E9
| 211410 ||  || — || November 11, 2002 || Socorro || LINEAR || GEF || align=right | 2.4 km || 
|-id=411 bgcolor=#E9E9E9
| 211411 ||  || — || November 12, 2002 || Socorro || LINEAR || — || align=right | 3.4 km || 
|-id=412 bgcolor=#E9E9E9
| 211412 ||  || — || November 12, 2002 || Socorro || LINEAR || TIN || align=right | 1.8 km || 
|-id=413 bgcolor=#E9E9E9
| 211413 ||  || — || November 13, 2002 || Palomar || NEAT || DOR || align=right | 4.7 km || 
|-id=414 bgcolor=#E9E9E9
| 211414 ||  || — || November 13, 2002 || Kitt Peak || Spacewatch || EUN || align=right | 2.1 km || 
|-id=415 bgcolor=#d6d6d6
| 211415 ||  || — || November 11, 2002 || Socorro || LINEAR || — || align=right | 3.9 km || 
|-id=416 bgcolor=#E9E9E9
| 211416 ||  || — || November 6, 2002 || Socorro || LINEAR || — || align=right | 2.7 km || 
|-id=417 bgcolor=#E9E9E9
| 211417 ||  || — || November 4, 2002 || Palomar || NEAT || — || align=right | 3.4 km || 
|-id=418 bgcolor=#d6d6d6
| 211418 ||  || — || November 27, 2002 || Anderson Mesa || LONEOS || — || align=right | 4.9 km || 
|-id=419 bgcolor=#E9E9E9
| 211419 ||  || — || November 28, 2002 || Anderson Mesa || LONEOS || — || align=right | 4.3 km || 
|-id=420 bgcolor=#E9E9E9
| 211420 ||  || — || November 23, 2002 || Palomar || NEAT || — || align=right | 2.8 km || 
|-id=421 bgcolor=#d6d6d6
| 211421 ||  || — || November 16, 2002 || Palomar || NEAT || KOR || align=right | 2.0 km || 
|-id=422 bgcolor=#d6d6d6
| 211422 ||  || — || November 25, 2002 || Palomar || NEAT || — || align=right | 2.7 km || 
|-id=423 bgcolor=#E9E9E9
| 211423 ||  || — || December 1, 2002 || Socorro || LINEAR || — || align=right | 4.6 km || 
|-id=424 bgcolor=#E9E9E9
| 211424 ||  || — || December 2, 2002 || Socorro || LINEAR || — || align=right | 3.6 km || 
|-id=425 bgcolor=#d6d6d6
| 211425 ||  || — || December 5, 2002 || Socorro || LINEAR || KOR || align=right | 1.9 km || 
|-id=426 bgcolor=#E9E9E9
| 211426 ||  || — || December 2, 2002 || Socorro || LINEAR || — || align=right | 2.1 km || 
|-id=427 bgcolor=#d6d6d6
| 211427 ||  || — || December 2, 2002 || Socorro || LINEAR || — || align=right | 3.8 km || 
|-id=428 bgcolor=#d6d6d6
| 211428 ||  || — || December 6, 2002 || Socorro || LINEAR || THB || align=right | 5.0 km || 
|-id=429 bgcolor=#d6d6d6
| 211429 ||  || — || December 7, 2002 || Socorro || LINEAR || — || align=right | 4.8 km || 
|-id=430 bgcolor=#d6d6d6
| 211430 ||  || — || December 10, 2002 || Palomar || NEAT || — || align=right | 3.0 km || 
|-id=431 bgcolor=#d6d6d6
| 211431 ||  || — || December 11, 2002 || Socorro || LINEAR || — || align=right | 4.5 km || 
|-id=432 bgcolor=#d6d6d6
| 211432 ||  || — || December 11, 2002 || Socorro || LINEAR || — || align=right | 4.3 km || 
|-id=433 bgcolor=#E9E9E9
| 211433 ||  || — || December 10, 2002 || Socorro || LINEAR || — || align=right | 3.7 km || 
|-id=434 bgcolor=#E9E9E9
| 211434 ||  || — || December 5, 2002 || Socorro || LINEAR || — || align=right | 3.3 km || 
|-id=435 bgcolor=#d6d6d6
| 211435 ||  || — || December 31, 2002 || Socorro || LINEAR || — || align=right | 4.2 km || 
|-id=436 bgcolor=#d6d6d6
| 211436 ||  || — || December 31, 2002 || Socorro || LINEAR || — || align=right | 4.1 km || 
|-id=437 bgcolor=#d6d6d6
| 211437 ||  || — || December 31, 2002 || Anderson Mesa || LONEOS || — || align=right | 4.0 km || 
|-id=438 bgcolor=#E9E9E9
| 211438 ||  || — || December 31, 2002 || Socorro || LINEAR || MRX || align=right | 1.9 km || 
|-id=439 bgcolor=#d6d6d6
| 211439 ||  || — || December 31, 2002 || Socorro || LINEAR || — || align=right | 3.0 km || 
|-id=440 bgcolor=#d6d6d6
| 211440 ||  || — || January 4, 2003 || Socorro || LINEAR || — || align=right | 5.6 km || 
|-id=441 bgcolor=#d6d6d6
| 211441 ||  || — || January 5, 2003 || Socorro || LINEAR || EOS || align=right | 3.4 km || 
|-id=442 bgcolor=#d6d6d6
| 211442 ||  || — || January 5, 2003 || Socorro || LINEAR || — || align=right | 5.0 km || 
|-id=443 bgcolor=#d6d6d6
| 211443 ||  || — || January 5, 2003 || Socorro || LINEAR || — || align=right | 6.4 km || 
|-id=444 bgcolor=#d6d6d6
| 211444 ||  || — || January 5, 2003 || Socorro || LINEAR || — || align=right | 5.5 km || 
|-id=445 bgcolor=#d6d6d6
| 211445 ||  || — || January 7, 2003 || Socorro || LINEAR || — || align=right | 5.1 km || 
|-id=446 bgcolor=#d6d6d6
| 211446 ||  || — || January 7, 2003 || Socorro || LINEAR || — || align=right | 5.4 km || 
|-id=447 bgcolor=#d6d6d6
| 211447 ||  || — || January 10, 2003 || Socorro || LINEAR || HYG || align=right | 3.4 km || 
|-id=448 bgcolor=#d6d6d6
| 211448 ||  || — || January 10, 2003 || Socorro || LINEAR || — || align=right | 5.3 km || 
|-id=449 bgcolor=#d6d6d6
| 211449 ||  || — || January 10, 2003 || Socorro || LINEAR || — || align=right | 6.0 km || 
|-id=450 bgcolor=#d6d6d6
| 211450 ||  || — || January 26, 2003 || Anderson Mesa || LONEOS || THM || align=right | 4.1 km || 
|-id=451 bgcolor=#d6d6d6
| 211451 ||  || — || January 26, 2003 || Palomar || NEAT || — || align=right | 4.5 km || 
|-id=452 bgcolor=#d6d6d6
| 211452 ||  || — || January 26, 2003 || Palomar || NEAT || — || align=right | 3.9 km || 
|-id=453 bgcolor=#d6d6d6
| 211453 ||  || — || January 27, 2003 || Palomar || NEAT || 637 || align=right | 3.4 km || 
|-id=454 bgcolor=#d6d6d6
| 211454 ||  || — || January 27, 2003 || Haleakala || NEAT || — || align=right | 3.7 km || 
|-id=455 bgcolor=#d6d6d6
| 211455 ||  || — || January 28, 2003 || Kitt Peak || Spacewatch || — || align=right | 3.5 km || 
|-id=456 bgcolor=#d6d6d6
| 211456 ||  || — || January 27, 2003 || Anderson Mesa || LONEOS || — || align=right | 5.2 km || 
|-id=457 bgcolor=#d6d6d6
| 211457 ||  || — || January 28, 2003 || Palomar || NEAT || — || align=right | 5.0 km || 
|-id=458 bgcolor=#d6d6d6
| 211458 ||  || — || January 29, 2003 || Palomar || NEAT || — || align=right | 4.3 km || 
|-id=459 bgcolor=#d6d6d6
| 211459 ||  || — || January 29, 2003 || Palomar || NEAT || TIR || align=right | 4.2 km || 
|-id=460 bgcolor=#d6d6d6
| 211460 ||  || — || January 31, 2003 || Socorro || LINEAR || — || align=right | 5.2 km || 
|-id=461 bgcolor=#d6d6d6
| 211461 ||  || — || January 28, 2003 || Socorro || LINEAR || — || align=right | 4.0 km || 
|-id=462 bgcolor=#d6d6d6
| 211462 ||  || — || January 27, 2003 || Socorro || LINEAR || — || align=right | 5.5 km || 
|-id=463 bgcolor=#d6d6d6
| 211463 ||  || — || January 26, 2003 || Haleakala || NEAT || — || align=right | 5.0 km || 
|-id=464 bgcolor=#d6d6d6
| 211464 ||  || — || February 1, 2003 || Haleakala || NEAT || — || align=right | 3.6 km || 
|-id=465 bgcolor=#d6d6d6
| 211465 ||  || — || February 5, 2003 || Haleakala || NEAT || TIR || align=right | 3.3 km || 
|-id=466 bgcolor=#d6d6d6
| 211466 ||  || — || February 3, 2003 || Palomar || NEAT || — || align=right | 4.2 km || 
|-id=467 bgcolor=#d6d6d6
| 211467 ||  || — || February 4, 2003 || Haleakala || NEAT || — || align=right | 5.4 km || 
|-id=468 bgcolor=#d6d6d6
| 211468 ||  || — || February 2, 2003 || Anderson Mesa || LONEOS || — || align=right | 3.7 km || 
|-id=469 bgcolor=#d6d6d6
| 211469 ||  || — || February 22, 2003 || Palomar || NEAT || — || align=right | 4.5 km || 
|-id=470 bgcolor=#d6d6d6
| 211470 ||  || — || February 25, 2003 || Campo Imperatore || CINEOS || — || align=right | 5.0 km || 
|-id=471 bgcolor=#d6d6d6
| 211471 ||  || — || February 21, 2003 || Palomar || NEAT || — || align=right | 5.0 km || 
|-id=472 bgcolor=#d6d6d6
| 211472 ||  || — || February 21, 2003 || Palomar || NEAT || TIR || align=right | 7.3 km || 
|-id=473 bgcolor=#E9E9E9
| 211473 Herin ||  ||  || March 4, 2003 || Saint-Véran || Saint-Véran Obs. || — || align=right | 3.2 km || 
|-id=474 bgcolor=#d6d6d6
| 211474 ||  || — || March 6, 2003 || Anderson Mesa || LONEOS || — || align=right | 4.5 km || 
|-id=475 bgcolor=#d6d6d6
| 211475 ||  || — || March 6, 2003 || Socorro || LINEAR || — || align=right | 4.6 km || 
|-id=476 bgcolor=#d6d6d6
| 211476 ||  || — || March 8, 2003 || Anderson Mesa || LONEOS || — || align=right | 6.7 km || 
|-id=477 bgcolor=#d6d6d6
| 211477 ||  || — || March 8, 2003 || Socorro || LINEAR || — || align=right | 7.4 km || 
|-id=478 bgcolor=#d6d6d6
| 211478 ||  || — || March 8, 2003 || Palomar || NEAT || EOS || align=right | 3.0 km || 
|-id=479 bgcolor=#d6d6d6
| 211479 ||  || — || March 13, 2003 || Socorro || LINEAR || — || align=right | 6.3 km || 
|-id=480 bgcolor=#d6d6d6
| 211480 ||  || — || March 26, 2003 || Wrightwood || J. W. Young || KOR || align=right | 1.9 km || 
|-id=481 bgcolor=#E9E9E9
| 211481 ||  || — || March 24, 2003 || Kitt Peak || Spacewatch || — || align=right | 1.9 km || 
|-id=482 bgcolor=#d6d6d6
| 211482 ||  || — || March 25, 2003 || Palomar || NEAT || EOS || align=right | 3.5 km || 
|-id=483 bgcolor=#d6d6d6
| 211483 ||  || — || March 28, 2003 || Kitt Peak || Spacewatch || MEL || align=right | 5.4 km || 
|-id=484 bgcolor=#d6d6d6
| 211484 ||  || — || March 29, 2003 || Anderson Mesa || LONEOS || VER || align=right | 4.1 km || 
|-id=485 bgcolor=#E9E9E9
| 211485 ||  || — || March 27, 2003 || Anderson Mesa || LONEOS || — || align=right | 4.0 km || 
|-id=486 bgcolor=#d6d6d6
| 211486 ||  || — || April 6, 2003 || Anderson Mesa || LONEOS || EUP || align=right | 4.4 km || 
|-id=487 bgcolor=#E9E9E9
| 211487 ||  || — || April 7, 2003 || Kitt Peak || Spacewatch || HEN || align=right | 1.4 km || 
|-id=488 bgcolor=#E9E9E9
| 211488 ||  || — || April 27, 2003 || Anderson Mesa || LONEOS || — || align=right | 1.5 km || 
|-id=489 bgcolor=#fefefe
| 211489 || 2003 KP || — || May 22, 2003 || Wrightwood || J. W. Young || — || align=right data-sort-value="0.90" | 900 m || 
|-id=490 bgcolor=#fefefe
| 211490 || 2003 MZ || — || June 22, 2003 || Anderson Mesa || LONEOS || — || align=right data-sort-value="0.94" | 940 m || 
|-id=491 bgcolor=#fefefe
| 211491 ||  || — || July 3, 2003 || Socorro || LINEAR || — || align=right | 1.1 km || 
|-id=492 bgcolor=#fefefe
| 211492 ||  || — || July 7, 2003 || Reedy Creek || J. Broughton || — || align=right | 1.2 km || 
|-id=493 bgcolor=#fefefe
| 211493 ||  || — || July 1, 2003 || Socorro || LINEAR || FLO || align=right data-sort-value="0.79" | 790 m || 
|-id=494 bgcolor=#fefefe
| 211494 ||  || — || July 3, 2003 || Kitt Peak || Spacewatch || — || align=right data-sort-value="0.80" | 800 m || 
|-id=495 bgcolor=#fefefe
| 211495 ||  || — || July 25, 2003 || Palomar || NEAT || FLO || align=right data-sort-value="0.94" | 940 m || 
|-id=496 bgcolor=#fefefe
| 211496 ||  || — || July 23, 2003 || Palomar || NEAT || PHO || align=right | 1.4 km || 
|-id=497 bgcolor=#fefefe
| 211497 ||  || — || July 31, 2003 || Haleakala || NEAT || — || align=right | 1.3 km || 
|-id=498 bgcolor=#fefefe
| 211498 ||  || — || August 1, 2003 || Socorro || LINEAR || FLO || align=right | 1.0 km || 
|-id=499 bgcolor=#fefefe
| 211499 ||  || — || August 1, 2003 || Haleakala || NEAT || ERI || align=right | 2.8 km || 
|-id=500 bgcolor=#fefefe
| 211500 ||  || — || August 4, 2003 || Socorro || LINEAR || — || align=right | 1.1 km || 
|}

211501–211600 

|-bgcolor=#fefefe
| 211501 ||  || — || August 19, 2003 || Campo Imperatore || CINEOS || V || align=right data-sort-value="0.72" | 720 m || 
|-id=502 bgcolor=#fefefe
| 211502 ||  || — || August 21, 2003 || Haleakala || NEAT || FLO || align=right data-sort-value="0.93" | 930 m || 
|-id=503 bgcolor=#fefefe
| 211503 ||  || — || August 21, 2003 || Haleakala || NEAT || V || align=right data-sort-value="0.92" | 920 m || 
|-id=504 bgcolor=#fefefe
| 211504 ||  || — || August 20, 2003 || Palomar || NEAT || — || align=right | 1.1 km || 
|-id=505 bgcolor=#fefefe
| 211505 ||  || — || August 22, 2003 || Palomar || NEAT || — || align=right | 1.3 km || 
|-id=506 bgcolor=#fefefe
| 211506 ||  || — || August 22, 2003 || Palomar || NEAT || — || align=right | 1.4 km || 
|-id=507 bgcolor=#fefefe
| 211507 ||  || — || August 22, 2003 || Haleakala || NEAT || PHO || align=right | 1.9 km || 
|-id=508 bgcolor=#fefefe
| 211508 ||  || — || August 22, 2003 || Haleakala || NEAT || — || align=right | 1.4 km || 
|-id=509 bgcolor=#fefefe
| 211509 ||  || — || August 22, 2003 || Campo Imperatore || CINEOS || ERI || align=right | 3.1 km || 
|-id=510 bgcolor=#fefefe
| 211510 ||  || — || August 22, 2003 || Socorro || LINEAR || — || align=right | 1.2 km || 
|-id=511 bgcolor=#fefefe
| 211511 ||  || — || August 22, 2003 || Socorro || LINEAR || — || align=right | 1.3 km || 
|-id=512 bgcolor=#fefefe
| 211512 ||  || — || August 22, 2003 || Palomar || NEAT || — || align=right | 1.1 km || 
|-id=513 bgcolor=#fefefe
| 211513 ||  || — || August 22, 2003 || Haleakala || NEAT || NYS || align=right data-sort-value="0.98" | 980 m || 
|-id=514 bgcolor=#fefefe
| 211514 ||  || — || August 22, 2003 || Palomar || NEAT || — || align=right | 1.3 km || 
|-id=515 bgcolor=#fefefe
| 211515 ||  || — || August 22, 2003 || Palomar || NEAT || — || align=right | 1.4 km || 
|-id=516 bgcolor=#fefefe
| 211516 ||  || — || August 23, 2003 || Palomar || NEAT || V || align=right data-sort-value="0.95" | 950 m || 
|-id=517 bgcolor=#fefefe
| 211517 ||  || — || August 23, 2003 || Palomar || NEAT || — || align=right | 1.3 km || 
|-id=518 bgcolor=#fefefe
| 211518 ||  || — || August 23, 2003 || Socorro || LINEAR || — || align=right | 1.1 km || 
|-id=519 bgcolor=#fefefe
| 211519 ||  || — || August 23, 2003 || Socorro || LINEAR || — || align=right | 1.2 km || 
|-id=520 bgcolor=#fefefe
| 211520 ||  || — || August 23, 2003 || Socorro || LINEAR || — || align=right | 1.1 km || 
|-id=521 bgcolor=#fefefe
| 211521 ||  || — || August 23, 2003 || Socorro || LINEAR || V || align=right data-sort-value="0.95" | 950 m || 
|-id=522 bgcolor=#fefefe
| 211522 ||  || — || August 23, 2003 || Socorro || LINEAR || — || align=right | 1.2 km || 
|-id=523 bgcolor=#fefefe
| 211523 ||  || — || August 23, 2003 || Socorro || LINEAR || FLO || align=right | 1.4 km || 
|-id=524 bgcolor=#fefefe
| 211524 ||  || — || August 23, 2003 || Socorro || LINEAR || — || align=right | 1.4 km || 
|-id=525 bgcolor=#fefefe
| 211525 ||  || — || August 23, 2003 || Socorro || LINEAR || NYS || align=right | 1.1 km || 
|-id=526 bgcolor=#fefefe
| 211526 ||  || — || August 25, 2003 || Socorro || LINEAR || — || align=right | 1.2 km || 
|-id=527 bgcolor=#fefefe
| 211527 ||  || — || August 24, 2003 || Socorro || LINEAR || — || align=right | 1.2 km || 
|-id=528 bgcolor=#fefefe
| 211528 ||  || — || August 28, 2003 || Haleakala || NEAT || — || align=right | 1.1 km || 
|-id=529 bgcolor=#E9E9E9
| 211529 ||  || — || August 30, 2003 || Kitt Peak || Spacewatch || — || align=right | 1.4 km || 
|-id=530 bgcolor=#fefefe
| 211530 ||  || — || August 28, 2003 || Palomar || NEAT || — || align=right | 1.0 km || 
|-id=531 bgcolor=#fefefe
| 211531 ||  || — || August 31, 2003 || Haleakala || NEAT || — || align=right | 1.7 km || 
|-id=532 bgcolor=#fefefe
| 211532 ||  || — || August 29, 2003 || Socorro || LINEAR || — || align=right | 1.3 km || 
|-id=533 bgcolor=#fefefe
| 211533 ||  || — || August 31, 2003 || Socorro || LINEAR || — || align=right | 1.4 km || 
|-id=534 bgcolor=#fefefe
| 211534 ||  || — || September 1, 2003 || Socorro || LINEAR || V || align=right data-sort-value="0.76" | 760 m || 
|-id=535 bgcolor=#fefefe
| 211535 ||  || — || September 1, 2003 || Socorro || LINEAR || — || align=right | 1.1 km || 
|-id=536 bgcolor=#fefefe
| 211536 ||  || — || September 15, 2003 || Wrightwood || J. W. Young || V || align=right data-sort-value="0.81" | 810 m || 
|-id=537 bgcolor=#E9E9E9
| 211537 ||  || — || September 14, 2003 || Palomar || NEAT || — || align=right | 3.6 km || 
|-id=538 bgcolor=#E9E9E9
| 211538 ||  || — || September 15, 2003 || Palomar || NEAT || HNS || align=right | 1.9 km || 
|-id=539 bgcolor=#fefefe
| 211539 ||  || — || September 15, 2003 || Anderson Mesa || LONEOS || — || align=right | 1.1 km || 
|-id=540 bgcolor=#fefefe
| 211540 ||  || — || September 15, 2003 || Anderson Mesa || LONEOS || MAS || align=right data-sort-value="0.83" | 830 m || 
|-id=541 bgcolor=#fefefe
| 211541 ||  || — || September 15, 2003 || Anderson Mesa || LONEOS || — || align=right | 1.3 km || 
|-id=542 bgcolor=#fefefe
| 211542 ||  || — || September 16, 2003 || Kitt Peak || Spacewatch || — || align=right | 1.1 km || 
|-id=543 bgcolor=#fefefe
| 211543 ||  || — || September 16, 2003 || Kitt Peak || Spacewatch || — || align=right | 1.4 km || 
|-id=544 bgcolor=#fefefe
| 211544 ||  || — || September 17, 2003 || Socorro || LINEAR || — || align=right | 1.6 km || 
|-id=545 bgcolor=#fefefe
| 211545 ||  || — || September 17, 2003 || Haleakala || NEAT || FLO || align=right data-sort-value="0.95" | 950 m || 
|-id=546 bgcolor=#fefefe
| 211546 ||  || — || September 16, 2003 || Palomar || NEAT || FLO || align=right | 2.0 km || 
|-id=547 bgcolor=#fefefe
| 211547 ||  || — || September 16, 2003 || Anderson Mesa || LONEOS || V || align=right | 1.00 km || 
|-id=548 bgcolor=#fefefe
| 211548 ||  || — || September 16, 2003 || Anderson Mesa || LONEOS || — || align=right | 1.1 km || 
|-id=549 bgcolor=#fefefe
| 211549 ||  || — || September 16, 2003 || Anderson Mesa || LONEOS || — || align=right | 1.2 km || 
|-id=550 bgcolor=#fefefe
| 211550 ||  || — || September 16, 2003 || Anderson Mesa || LONEOS || — || align=right | 1.8 km || 
|-id=551 bgcolor=#fefefe
| 211551 ||  || — || September 18, 2003 || Palomar || NEAT || NYS || align=right | 1.1 km || 
|-id=552 bgcolor=#fefefe
| 211552 ||  || — || September 18, 2003 || Palomar || NEAT || V || align=right | 1.1 km || 
|-id=553 bgcolor=#E9E9E9
| 211553 ||  || — || September 19, 2003 || Palomar || NEAT || — || align=right | 1.5 km || 
|-id=554 bgcolor=#fefefe
| 211554 ||  || — || September 16, 2003 || Anderson Mesa || LONEOS || V || align=right data-sort-value="0.98" | 980 m || 
|-id=555 bgcolor=#fefefe
| 211555 ||  || — || September 16, 2003 || Kitt Peak || Spacewatch || — || align=right | 1.4 km || 
|-id=556 bgcolor=#fefefe
| 211556 ||  || — || September 17, 2003 || Anderson Mesa || LONEOS || — || align=right | 1.6 km || 
|-id=557 bgcolor=#fefefe
| 211557 ||  || — || September 18, 2003 || Kitt Peak || Spacewatch || V || align=right data-sort-value="0.96" | 960 m || 
|-id=558 bgcolor=#fefefe
| 211558 ||  || — || September 18, 2003 || Kitt Peak || Spacewatch || V || align=right data-sort-value="0.92" | 920 m || 
|-id=559 bgcolor=#fefefe
| 211559 ||  || — || September 18, 2003 || Palomar || NEAT || V || align=right | 1.2 km || 
|-id=560 bgcolor=#fefefe
| 211560 ||  || — || September 18, 2003 || Kitt Peak || Spacewatch || — || align=right | 1.6 km || 
|-id=561 bgcolor=#fefefe
| 211561 ||  || — || September 19, 2003 || Campo Imperatore || CINEOS || — || align=right | 1.2 km || 
|-id=562 bgcolor=#fefefe
| 211562 ||  || — || September 19, 2003 || Palomar || NEAT || — || align=right | 1.4 km || 
|-id=563 bgcolor=#fefefe
| 211563 ||  || — || September 20, 2003 || Socorro || LINEAR || NYS || align=right data-sort-value="0.94" | 940 m || 
|-id=564 bgcolor=#fefefe
| 211564 ||  || — || September 20, 2003 || Palomar || NEAT || — || align=right | 1.2 km || 
|-id=565 bgcolor=#fefefe
| 211565 ||  || — || September 17, 2003 || Goodricke-Pigott || R. A. Tucker || NYS || align=right data-sort-value="0.92" | 920 m || 
|-id=566 bgcolor=#fefefe
| 211566 ||  || — || September 18, 2003 || Socorro || LINEAR || — || align=right | 1.3 km || 
|-id=567 bgcolor=#fefefe
| 211567 ||  || — || September 19, 2003 || Kitt Peak || Spacewatch || NYS || align=right | 1.2 km || 
|-id=568 bgcolor=#fefefe
| 211568 ||  || — || September 21, 2003 || Desert Eagle || W. K. Y. Yeung || NYS || align=right data-sort-value="0.87" | 870 m || 
|-id=569 bgcolor=#E9E9E9
| 211569 ||  || — || September 20, 2003 || Uccle || T. Pauwels || JUN || align=right | 1.7 km || 
|-id=570 bgcolor=#fefefe
| 211570 ||  || — || September 17, 2003 || Socorro || LINEAR || V || align=right | 1.0 km || 
|-id=571 bgcolor=#fefefe
| 211571 ||  || — || September 19, 2003 || Anderson Mesa || LONEOS || — || align=right | 1.3 km || 
|-id=572 bgcolor=#fefefe
| 211572 ||  || — || September 19, 2003 || Anderson Mesa || LONEOS || — || align=right | 1.2 km || 
|-id=573 bgcolor=#E9E9E9
| 211573 ||  || — || September 17, 2003 || Kitt Peak || Spacewatch || — || align=right | 1.1 km || 
|-id=574 bgcolor=#fefefe
| 211574 ||  || — || September 18, 2003 || Palomar || NEAT || — || align=right | 1.2 km || 
|-id=575 bgcolor=#fefefe
| 211575 ||  || — || September 18, 2003 || Palomar || NEAT || — || align=right | 1.7 km || 
|-id=576 bgcolor=#E9E9E9
| 211576 ||  || — || September 22, 2003 || Kitt Peak || Spacewatch || — || align=right | 1.7 km || 
|-id=577 bgcolor=#fefefe
| 211577 ||  || — || September 23, 2003 || Haleakala || NEAT || FLO || align=right | 1.3 km || 
|-id=578 bgcolor=#fefefe
| 211578 ||  || — || September 18, 2003 || Palomar || NEAT || FLO || align=right | 1.4 km || 
|-id=579 bgcolor=#fefefe
| 211579 ||  || — || September 18, 2003 || Palomar || NEAT || — || align=right | 1.2 km || 
|-id=580 bgcolor=#fefefe
| 211580 ||  || — || September 20, 2003 || Socorro || LINEAR || V || align=right data-sort-value="0.99" | 990 m || 
|-id=581 bgcolor=#fefefe
| 211581 ||  || — || September 20, 2003 || Socorro || LINEAR || NYS || align=right data-sort-value="0.97" | 970 m || 
|-id=582 bgcolor=#fefefe
| 211582 ||  || — || September 20, 2003 || Socorro || LINEAR || — || align=right | 1.2 km || 
|-id=583 bgcolor=#FA8072
| 211583 ||  || — || September 21, 2003 || Anderson Mesa || LONEOS || — || align=right | 1.2 km || 
|-id=584 bgcolor=#fefefe
| 211584 ||  || — || September 22, 2003 || Anderson Mesa || LONEOS || — || align=right | 1.4 km || 
|-id=585 bgcolor=#E9E9E9
| 211585 ||  || — || September 27, 2003 || Socorro || LINEAR || — || align=right | 1.2 km || 
|-id=586 bgcolor=#fefefe
| 211586 ||  || — || September 27, 2003 || Socorro || LINEAR || — || align=right | 1.2 km || 
|-id=587 bgcolor=#E9E9E9
| 211587 ||  || — || September 27, 2003 || Socorro || LINEAR || — || align=right | 1.8 km || 
|-id=588 bgcolor=#E9E9E9
| 211588 ||  || — || September 27, 2003 || Kitt Peak || Spacewatch || — || align=right | 1.1 km || 
|-id=589 bgcolor=#fefefe
| 211589 ||  || — || September 25, 2003 || Haleakala || NEAT || — || align=right data-sort-value="0.98" | 980 m || 
|-id=590 bgcolor=#fefefe
| 211590 ||  || — || September 26, 2003 || Socorro || LINEAR || NYS || align=right | 2.1 km || 
|-id=591 bgcolor=#fefefe
| 211591 ||  || — || September 26, 2003 || Socorro || LINEAR || V || align=right | 1.2 km || 
|-id=592 bgcolor=#E9E9E9
| 211592 ||  || — || September 26, 2003 || Socorro || LINEAR || — || align=right | 2.3 km || 
|-id=593 bgcolor=#E9E9E9
| 211593 ||  || — || September 28, 2003 || Kitt Peak || Spacewatch || — || align=right | 1.9 km || 
|-id=594 bgcolor=#fefefe
| 211594 ||  || — || September 28, 2003 || Kitt Peak || Spacewatch || NYS || align=right data-sort-value="0.87" | 870 m || 
|-id=595 bgcolor=#fefefe
| 211595 ||  || — || September 28, 2003 || Goodricke-Pigott || R. A. Tucker || NYS || align=right data-sort-value="0.94" | 940 m || 
|-id=596 bgcolor=#E9E9E9
| 211596 ||  || — || September 25, 2003 || Palomar || NEAT || — || align=right | 1.4 km || 
|-id=597 bgcolor=#fefefe
| 211597 ||  || — || September 26, 2003 || Socorro || LINEAR || — || align=right | 1.8 km || 
|-id=598 bgcolor=#fefefe
| 211598 ||  || — || September 29, 2003 || Socorro || LINEAR || SUL || align=right | 3.1 km || 
|-id=599 bgcolor=#fefefe
| 211599 ||  || — || September 30, 2003 || Socorro || LINEAR || — || align=right | 1.3 km || 
|-id=600 bgcolor=#fefefe
| 211600 ||  || — || September 17, 2003 || Palomar || NEAT || V || align=right | 1.2 km || 
|}

211601–211700 

|-bgcolor=#fefefe
| 211601 ||  || — || September 28, 2003 || Socorro || LINEAR || — || align=right | 1.4 km || 
|-id=602 bgcolor=#fefefe
| 211602 ||  || — || September 18, 2003 || Kitt Peak || Spacewatch || — || align=right | 1.2 km || 
|-id=603 bgcolor=#fefefe
| 211603 ||  || — || September 22, 2003 || Kitt Peak || Spacewatch || V || align=right data-sort-value="0.78" | 780 m || 
|-id=604 bgcolor=#E9E9E9
| 211604 ||  || — || September 27, 2003 || Apache Point || SDSS || — || align=right | 1.6 km || 
|-id=605 bgcolor=#fefefe
| 211605 ||  || — || September 22, 2003 || Kitt Peak || Spacewatch || CLA || align=right | 2.1 km || 
|-id=606 bgcolor=#E9E9E9
| 211606 ||  || — || September 28, 2003 || Kitt Peak || Spacewatch || — || align=right | 1.6 km || 
|-id=607 bgcolor=#fefefe
| 211607 ||  || — || October 15, 2003 || Anderson Mesa || LONEOS || — || align=right | 1.7 km || 
|-id=608 bgcolor=#E9E9E9
| 211608 ||  || — || October 15, 2003 || Palomar || NEAT || — || align=right | 1.2 km || 
|-id=609 bgcolor=#fefefe
| 211609 ||  || — || October 15, 2003 || Anderson Mesa || LONEOS || V || align=right data-sort-value="0.97" | 970 m || 
|-id=610 bgcolor=#fefefe
| 211610 ||  || — || October 2, 2003 || Kitt Peak || Spacewatch || — || align=right | 1.3 km || 
|-id=611 bgcolor=#fefefe
| 211611 ||  || — || October 16, 2003 || Anderson Mesa || LONEOS || — || align=right | 1.4 km || 
|-id=612 bgcolor=#d6d6d6
| 211612 ||  || — || October 18, 2003 || Kitt Peak || Spacewatch || — || align=right | 2.7 km || 
|-id=613 bgcolor=#E9E9E9
| 211613 Christophelovis ||  ||  || October 25, 2003 || Vicques || M. Ory || — || align=right | 1.7 km || 
|-id=614 bgcolor=#E9E9E9
| 211614 ||  || — || October 16, 2003 || Kitt Peak || Spacewatch || — || align=right | 1.8 km || 
|-id=615 bgcolor=#fefefe
| 211615 ||  || — || October 16, 2003 || Anderson Mesa || LONEOS || — || align=right | 1.3 km || 
|-id=616 bgcolor=#E9E9E9
| 211616 ||  || — || October 18, 2003 || Palomar || NEAT || MIT || align=right | 3.8 km || 
|-id=617 bgcolor=#E9E9E9
| 211617 ||  || — || October 17, 2003 || Anderson Mesa || LONEOS || ADE || align=right | 2.6 km || 
|-id=618 bgcolor=#fefefe
| 211618 ||  || — || October 16, 2003 || Anderson Mesa || LONEOS || — || align=right | 1.3 km || 
|-id=619 bgcolor=#fefefe
| 211619 ||  || — || October 16, 2003 || Anderson Mesa || LONEOS || NYS || align=right | 1.6 km || 
|-id=620 bgcolor=#fefefe
| 211620 ||  || — || October 16, 2003 || Palomar || NEAT || FLO || align=right | 1.5 km || 
|-id=621 bgcolor=#fefefe
| 211621 ||  || — || October 19, 2003 || Kitt Peak || Spacewatch || — || align=right | 1.1 km || 
|-id=622 bgcolor=#fefefe
| 211622 ||  || — || October 18, 2003 || Palomar || NEAT || — || align=right | 1.6 km || 
|-id=623 bgcolor=#fefefe
| 211623 ||  || — || October 20, 2003 || Socorro || LINEAR || V || align=right | 1.3 km || 
|-id=624 bgcolor=#fefefe
| 211624 ||  || — || October 21, 2003 || Socorro || LINEAR || — || align=right | 1.5 km || 
|-id=625 bgcolor=#E9E9E9
| 211625 ||  || — || October 18, 2003 || Kitt Peak || Spacewatch || — || align=right | 1.9 km || 
|-id=626 bgcolor=#fefefe
| 211626 ||  || — || October 19, 2003 || Palomar || NEAT || — || align=right | 2.6 km || 
|-id=627 bgcolor=#E9E9E9
| 211627 ||  || — || October 19, 2003 || Kitt Peak || Spacewatch || — || align=right | 1.1 km || 
|-id=628 bgcolor=#fefefe
| 211628 ||  || — || October 21, 2003 || Kitt Peak || Spacewatch || NYS || align=right data-sort-value="0.84" | 840 m || 
|-id=629 bgcolor=#E9E9E9
| 211629 ||  || — || October 18, 2003 || Palomar || NEAT || — || align=right | 1.5 km || 
|-id=630 bgcolor=#fefefe
| 211630 ||  || — || October 21, 2003 || Anderson Mesa || LONEOS || — || align=right | 1.1 km || 
|-id=631 bgcolor=#E9E9E9
| 211631 ||  || — || October 21, 2003 || Socorro || LINEAR || — || align=right | 1.1 km || 
|-id=632 bgcolor=#fefefe
| 211632 ||  || — || October 21, 2003 || Socorro || LINEAR || V || align=right data-sort-value="0.92" | 920 m || 
|-id=633 bgcolor=#fefefe
| 211633 ||  || — || October 18, 2003 || Anderson Mesa || LONEOS || — || align=right | 1.4 km || 
|-id=634 bgcolor=#fefefe
| 211634 ||  || — || October 18, 2003 || Anderson Mesa || LONEOS || — || align=right | 1.2 km || 
|-id=635 bgcolor=#E9E9E9
| 211635 ||  || — || October 20, 2003 || Kitt Peak || Spacewatch || — || align=right | 1.5 km || 
|-id=636 bgcolor=#fefefe
| 211636 ||  || — || October 21, 2003 || Socorro || LINEAR || — || align=right | 1.3 km || 
|-id=637 bgcolor=#E9E9E9
| 211637 ||  || — || October 22, 2003 || Socorro || LINEAR || — || align=right | 1.4 km || 
|-id=638 bgcolor=#E9E9E9
| 211638 ||  || — || October 22, 2003 || Kitt Peak || Spacewatch || — || align=right | 1.9 km || 
|-id=639 bgcolor=#E9E9E9
| 211639 ||  || — || October 21, 2003 || Socorro || LINEAR || — || align=right | 1.6 km || 
|-id=640 bgcolor=#fefefe
| 211640 ||  || — || October 21, 2003 || Socorro || LINEAR || — || align=right | 1.3 km || 
|-id=641 bgcolor=#fefefe
| 211641 ||  || — || October 22, 2003 || Kitt Peak || Spacewatch || — || align=right | 1.4 km || 
|-id=642 bgcolor=#fefefe
| 211642 ||  || — || October 22, 2003 || Kitt Peak || Spacewatch || MAS || align=right | 1.2 km || 
|-id=643 bgcolor=#E9E9E9
| 211643 ||  || — || October 23, 2003 || Anderson Mesa || LONEOS || — || align=right data-sort-value="0.94" | 940 m || 
|-id=644 bgcolor=#E9E9E9
| 211644 ||  || — || October 23, 2003 || Kitt Peak || Spacewatch || MIS || align=right | 2.7 km || 
|-id=645 bgcolor=#fefefe
| 211645 ||  || — || October 23, 2003 || Kitt Peak || Spacewatch || — || align=right | 1.3 km || 
|-id=646 bgcolor=#fefefe
| 211646 ||  || — || October 21, 2003 || Kitt Peak || Spacewatch || — || align=right | 2.3 km || 
|-id=647 bgcolor=#fefefe
| 211647 ||  || — || October 21, 2003 || Socorro || LINEAR || — || align=right | 1.3 km || 
|-id=648 bgcolor=#fefefe
| 211648 ||  || — || October 21, 2003 || Palomar || NEAT || NYS || align=right data-sort-value="0.78" | 780 m || 
|-id=649 bgcolor=#fefefe
| 211649 ||  || — || October 21, 2003 || Kitt Peak || Spacewatch || — || align=right | 1.2 km || 
|-id=650 bgcolor=#fefefe
| 211650 ||  || — || October 22, 2003 || Kitt Peak || Spacewatch || — || align=right | 3.9 km || 
|-id=651 bgcolor=#fefefe
| 211651 ||  || — || October 24, 2003 || Socorro || LINEAR || — || align=right | 1.2 km || 
|-id=652 bgcolor=#fefefe
| 211652 ||  || — || October 24, 2003 || Socorro || LINEAR || — || align=right | 1.1 km || 
|-id=653 bgcolor=#E9E9E9
| 211653 ||  || — || October 24, 2003 || Kitt Peak || Spacewatch || — || align=right | 1.3 km || 
|-id=654 bgcolor=#E9E9E9
| 211654 ||  || — || October 24, 2003 || Socorro || LINEAR || — || align=right | 1.7 km || 
|-id=655 bgcolor=#E9E9E9
| 211655 ||  || — || October 24, 2003 || Socorro || LINEAR || — || align=right | 3.6 km || 
|-id=656 bgcolor=#E9E9E9
| 211656 ||  || — || October 24, 2003 || Kitt Peak || Spacewatch || — || align=right | 1.0 km || 
|-id=657 bgcolor=#E9E9E9
| 211657 ||  || — || October 27, 2003 || Socorro || LINEAR || BRG || align=right | 1.5 km || 
|-id=658 bgcolor=#E9E9E9
| 211658 ||  || — || October 30, 2003 || Haleakala || NEAT || KON || align=right | 3.7 km || 
|-id=659 bgcolor=#E9E9E9
| 211659 ||  || — || October 26, 2003 || Kitt Peak || Spacewatch || — || align=right | 2.0 km || 
|-id=660 bgcolor=#E9E9E9
| 211660 ||  || — || October 29, 2003 || Anderson Mesa || LONEOS || — || align=right | 1.4 km || 
|-id=661 bgcolor=#E9E9E9
| 211661 ||  || — || October 21, 2003 || Socorro || LINEAR || — || align=right | 1.2 km || 
|-id=662 bgcolor=#fefefe
| 211662 ||  || — || October 17, 2003 || Kitt Peak || Spacewatch || — || align=right | 1.6 km || 
|-id=663 bgcolor=#fefefe
| 211663 ||  || — || October 17, 2003 || Apache Point || SDSS || — || align=right | 1.1 km || 
|-id=664 bgcolor=#fefefe
| 211664 ||  || — || October 22, 2003 || Apache Point || SDSS || — || align=right data-sort-value="0.91" | 910 m || 
|-id=665 bgcolor=#E9E9E9
| 211665 ||  || — || November 15, 2003 || Kitt Peak || Spacewatch || — || align=right | 1.4 km || 
|-id=666 bgcolor=#E9E9E9
| 211666 ||  || — || November 3, 2003 || Socorro || LINEAR || EUN || align=right | 1.6 km || 
|-id=667 bgcolor=#fefefe
| 211667 ||  || — || November 15, 2003 || Needville || Needville Obs. || — || align=right | 1.2 km || 
|-id=668 bgcolor=#E9E9E9
| 211668 ||  || — || November 15, 2003 || Palomar || NEAT || — || align=right | 1.2 km || 
|-id=669 bgcolor=#E9E9E9
| 211669 ||  || — || November 15, 2003 || Palomar || NEAT || — || align=right | 1.4 km || 
|-id=670 bgcolor=#fefefe
| 211670 ||  || — || November 18, 2003 || Palomar || NEAT || SUL || align=right | 2.8 km || 
|-id=671 bgcolor=#fefefe
| 211671 ||  || — || November 19, 2003 || Kitt Peak || Spacewatch || — || align=right | 1.8 km || 
|-id=672 bgcolor=#fefefe
| 211672 ||  || — || November 18, 2003 || Kitt Peak || Spacewatch || FLO || align=right data-sort-value="0.99" | 990 m || 
|-id=673 bgcolor=#fefefe
| 211673 ||  || — || November 18, 2003 || Palomar || NEAT || — || align=right | 1.5 km || 
|-id=674 bgcolor=#fefefe
| 211674 ||  || — || November 18, 2003 || Kitt Peak || Spacewatch || — || align=right | 1.2 km || 
|-id=675 bgcolor=#fefefe
| 211675 ||  || — || November 18, 2003 || Palomar || NEAT || — || align=right | 2.8 km || 
|-id=676 bgcolor=#E9E9E9
| 211676 ||  || — || November 20, 2003 || Socorro || LINEAR || — || align=right | 1.4 km || 
|-id=677 bgcolor=#E9E9E9
| 211677 ||  || — || November 20, 2003 || Socorro || LINEAR || — || align=right | 1.7 km || 
|-id=678 bgcolor=#E9E9E9
| 211678 ||  || — || November 19, 2003 || Kitt Peak || Spacewatch || — || align=right | 1.2 km || 
|-id=679 bgcolor=#E9E9E9
| 211679 ||  || — || November 19, 2003 || Kitt Peak || Spacewatch || JUN || align=right | 1.7 km || 
|-id=680 bgcolor=#E9E9E9
| 211680 ||  || — || November 20, 2003 || Palomar || NEAT || MAR || align=right | 1.7 km || 
|-id=681 bgcolor=#E9E9E9
| 211681 ||  || — || November 20, 2003 || Socorro || LINEAR || — || align=right | 1.9 km || 
|-id=682 bgcolor=#E9E9E9
| 211682 ||  || — || November 20, 2003 || Socorro || LINEAR || — || align=right | 1.9 km || 
|-id=683 bgcolor=#E9E9E9
| 211683 ||  || — || November 20, 2003 || Socorro || LINEAR || — || align=right | 2.4 km || 
|-id=684 bgcolor=#fefefe
| 211684 ||  || — || November 16, 2003 || Kitt Peak || Spacewatch || — || align=right | 1.1 km || 
|-id=685 bgcolor=#d6d6d6
| 211685 ||  || — || November 21, 2003 || Socorro || LINEAR || — || align=right | 4.9 km || 
|-id=686 bgcolor=#fefefe
| 211686 ||  || — || November 21, 2003 || Socorro || LINEAR || V || align=right | 1.1 km || 
|-id=687 bgcolor=#E9E9E9
| 211687 ||  || — || November 21, 2003 || Socorro || LINEAR || — || align=right | 1.9 km || 
|-id=688 bgcolor=#fefefe
| 211688 ||  || — || November 20, 2003 || Socorro || LINEAR || — || align=right | 1.7 km || 
|-id=689 bgcolor=#E9E9E9
| 211689 ||  || — || November 20, 2003 || Socorro || LINEAR || — || align=right | 1.4 km || 
|-id=690 bgcolor=#E9E9E9
| 211690 ||  || — || November 20, 2003 || Socorro || LINEAR || — || align=right | 1.8 km || 
|-id=691 bgcolor=#E9E9E9
| 211691 ||  || — || November 20, 2003 || Socorro || LINEAR || — || align=right | 1.4 km || 
|-id=692 bgcolor=#E9E9E9
| 211692 ||  || — || November 20, 2003 || Socorro || LINEAR || EUN || align=right | 2.1 km || 
|-id=693 bgcolor=#E9E9E9
| 211693 ||  || — || November 21, 2003 || Socorro || LINEAR || — || align=right | 1.1 km || 
|-id=694 bgcolor=#E9E9E9
| 211694 ||  || — || November 21, 2003 || Socorro || LINEAR || — || align=right | 1.8 km || 
|-id=695 bgcolor=#E9E9E9
| 211695 ||  || — || November 21, 2003 || Socorro || LINEAR || — || align=right | 2.1 km || 
|-id=696 bgcolor=#E9E9E9
| 211696 ||  || — || November 21, 2003 || Palomar || NEAT || — || align=right | 1.4 km || 
|-id=697 bgcolor=#E9E9E9
| 211697 ||  || — || November 21, 2003 || Palomar || NEAT || — || align=right | 1.8 km || 
|-id=698 bgcolor=#E9E9E9
| 211698 ||  || — || November 21, 2003 || Socorro || LINEAR || — || align=right | 1.4 km || 
|-id=699 bgcolor=#fefefe
| 211699 ||  || — || November 23, 2003 || Socorro || LINEAR || V || align=right | 1.2 km || 
|-id=700 bgcolor=#E9E9E9
| 211700 ||  || — || November 23, 2003 || Kitt Peak || Spacewatch || — || align=right | 2.3 km || 
|}

211701–211800 

|-bgcolor=#E9E9E9
| 211701 ||  || — || November 26, 2003 || Anderson Mesa || LONEOS || EUN || align=right | 1.6 km || 
|-id=702 bgcolor=#E9E9E9
| 211702 ||  || — || November 19, 2003 || Palomar || NEAT || EUN || align=right | 1.6 km || 
|-id=703 bgcolor=#E9E9E9
| 211703 ||  || — || December 1, 2003 || Kitt Peak || Spacewatch || — || align=right | 1.5 km || 
|-id=704 bgcolor=#E9E9E9
| 211704 ||  || — || December 1, 2003 || Socorro || LINEAR || — || align=right | 2.0 km || 
|-id=705 bgcolor=#E9E9E9
| 211705 ||  || — || December 1, 2003 || Socorro || LINEAR || — || align=right | 1.3 km || 
|-id=706 bgcolor=#E9E9E9
| 211706 ||  || — || December 3, 2003 || Socorro || LINEAR || MAR || align=right | 1.7 km || 
|-id=707 bgcolor=#E9E9E9
| 211707 ||  || — || December 3, 2003 || Anderson Mesa || LONEOS || — || align=right | 6.8 km || 
|-id=708 bgcolor=#E9E9E9
| 211708 ||  || — || December 4, 2003 || Socorro || LINEAR || JUN || align=right | 1.8 km || 
|-id=709 bgcolor=#E9E9E9
| 211709 ||  || — || December 14, 2003 || Palomar || NEAT || ADE || align=right | 3.3 km || 
|-id=710 bgcolor=#E9E9E9
| 211710 ||  || — || December 14, 2003 || Palomar || NEAT || HNS || align=right | 1.9 km || 
|-id=711 bgcolor=#E9E9E9
| 211711 ||  || — || December 17, 2003 || Socorro || LINEAR || — || align=right | 8.1 km || 
|-id=712 bgcolor=#E9E9E9
| 211712 ||  || — || December 19, 2003 || Kingsnake || J. V. McClusky || — || align=right | 3.4 km || 
|-id=713 bgcolor=#d6d6d6
| 211713 ||  || — || December 17, 2003 || Kitt Peak || Spacewatch || — || align=right | 7.9 km || 
|-id=714 bgcolor=#E9E9E9
| 211714 ||  || — || December 17, 2003 || Kitt Peak || Spacewatch || — || align=right | 2.3 km || 
|-id=715 bgcolor=#E9E9E9
| 211715 ||  || — || December 18, 2003 || Socorro || LINEAR || MIS || align=right | 4.2 km || 
|-id=716 bgcolor=#d6d6d6
| 211716 ||  || — || December 17, 2003 || Palomar || NEAT || — || align=right | 4.9 km || 
|-id=717 bgcolor=#E9E9E9
| 211717 ||  || — || December 19, 2003 || Socorro || LINEAR || — || align=right | 3.1 km || 
|-id=718 bgcolor=#E9E9E9
| 211718 ||  || — || December 17, 2003 || Kitt Peak || Spacewatch || AGN || align=right | 1.6 km || 
|-id=719 bgcolor=#E9E9E9
| 211719 ||  || — || December 19, 2003 || Kitt Peak || Spacewatch || — || align=right | 1.3 km || 
|-id=720 bgcolor=#E9E9E9
| 211720 ||  || — || December 19, 2003 || Socorro || LINEAR || — || align=right | 4.5 km || 
|-id=721 bgcolor=#E9E9E9
| 211721 ||  || — || December 19, 2003 || Kitt Peak || Spacewatch || NEM || align=right | 3.0 km || 
|-id=722 bgcolor=#E9E9E9
| 211722 ||  || — || December 19, 2003 || Kitt Peak || Spacewatch || AER || align=right | 2.1 km || 
|-id=723 bgcolor=#E9E9E9
| 211723 ||  || — || December 19, 2003 || Kitt Peak || Spacewatch || — || align=right | 2.3 km || 
|-id=724 bgcolor=#E9E9E9
| 211724 ||  || — || December 19, 2003 || Kitt Peak || Spacewatch || — || align=right | 1.4 km || 
|-id=725 bgcolor=#E9E9E9
| 211725 ||  || — || December 20, 2003 || Socorro || LINEAR || MAR || align=right | 1.8 km || 
|-id=726 bgcolor=#E9E9E9
| 211726 ||  || — || December 18, 2003 || Socorro || LINEAR || — || align=right | 1.3 km || 
|-id=727 bgcolor=#E9E9E9
| 211727 ||  || — || December 18, 2003 || Socorro || LINEAR || — || align=right | 2.1 km || 
|-id=728 bgcolor=#E9E9E9
| 211728 ||  || — || December 18, 2003 || Kitt Peak || Spacewatch || — || align=right | 1.6 km || 
|-id=729 bgcolor=#E9E9E9
| 211729 ||  || — || December 20, 2003 || Palomar || NEAT || — || align=right | 2.8 km || 
|-id=730 bgcolor=#d6d6d6
| 211730 ||  || — || December 19, 2003 || Socorro || LINEAR || EUP || align=right | 6.0 km || 
|-id=731 bgcolor=#E9E9E9
| 211731 ||  || — || December 21, 2003 || Socorro || LINEAR || — || align=right | 3.2 km || 
|-id=732 bgcolor=#d6d6d6
| 211732 ||  || — || December 22, 2003 || Socorro || LINEAR || EUP || align=right | 5.2 km || 
|-id=733 bgcolor=#E9E9E9
| 211733 ||  || — || December 22, 2003 || Socorro || LINEAR || — || align=right | 3.5 km || 
|-id=734 bgcolor=#E9E9E9
| 211734 ||  || — || December 27, 2003 || Kitt Peak || Spacewatch || — || align=right | 2.6 km || 
|-id=735 bgcolor=#E9E9E9
| 211735 ||  || — || December 27, 2003 || Socorro || LINEAR || — || align=right | 2.8 km || 
|-id=736 bgcolor=#E9E9E9
| 211736 ||  || — || December 27, 2003 || Kitt Peak || Spacewatch || — || align=right | 2.1 km || 
|-id=737 bgcolor=#E9E9E9
| 211737 ||  || — || December 27, 2003 || Socorro || LINEAR || — || align=right | 2.2 km || 
|-id=738 bgcolor=#E9E9E9
| 211738 ||  || — || December 25, 2003 || Socorro || LINEAR || — || align=right | 2.3 km || 
|-id=739 bgcolor=#fefefe
| 211739 ||  || — || December 27, 2003 || Kitt Peak || Spacewatch || MAS || align=right data-sort-value="0.84" | 840 m || 
|-id=740 bgcolor=#E9E9E9
| 211740 ||  || — || December 28, 2003 || Socorro || LINEAR || — || align=right | 1.8 km || 
|-id=741 bgcolor=#E9E9E9
| 211741 ||  || — || December 29, 2003 || Socorro || LINEAR || MAR || align=right | 2.2 km || 
|-id=742 bgcolor=#E9E9E9
| 211742 ||  || — || December 29, 2003 || Catalina || CSS || — || align=right | 2.7 km || 
|-id=743 bgcolor=#E9E9E9
| 211743 ||  || — || December 29, 2003 || Catalina || CSS || — || align=right | 4.0 km || 
|-id=744 bgcolor=#E9E9E9
| 211744 ||  || — || December 29, 2003 || Catalina || CSS || GEF || align=right | 1.9 km || 
|-id=745 bgcolor=#E9E9E9
| 211745 ||  || — || December 29, 2003 || Catalina || CSS || — || align=right | 3.5 km || 
|-id=746 bgcolor=#E9E9E9
| 211746 ||  || — || December 16, 2003 || Catalina || CSS || — || align=right | 1.6 km || 
|-id=747 bgcolor=#E9E9E9
| 211747 ||  || — || December 17, 2003 || Palomar || NEAT || EUN || align=right | 1.8 km || 
|-id=748 bgcolor=#E9E9E9
| 211748 ||  || — || December 17, 2003 || Kitt Peak || Spacewatch || — || align=right | 3.3 km || 
|-id=749 bgcolor=#E9E9E9
| 211749 ||  || — || December 18, 2003 || Socorro || LINEAR || — || align=right | 2.4 km || 
|-id=750 bgcolor=#E9E9E9
| 211750 ||  || — || January 13, 2004 || Anderson Mesa || LONEOS || — || align=right | 2.9 km || 
|-id=751 bgcolor=#E9E9E9
| 211751 ||  || — || January 13, 2004 || Anderson Mesa || LONEOS || — || align=right | 2.5 km || 
|-id=752 bgcolor=#E9E9E9
| 211752 ||  || — || January 14, 2004 || Palomar || NEAT || CLO || align=right | 2.9 km || 
|-id=753 bgcolor=#E9E9E9
| 211753 ||  || — || January 14, 2004 || Palomar || NEAT || GEF || align=right | 1.7 km || 
|-id=754 bgcolor=#E9E9E9
| 211754 ||  || — || January 15, 2004 || Kitt Peak || Spacewatch || — || align=right | 2.1 km || 
|-id=755 bgcolor=#E9E9E9
| 211755 ||  || — || January 16, 2004 || Palomar || NEAT || — || align=right | 2.4 km || 
|-id=756 bgcolor=#E9E9E9
| 211756 ||  || — || January 16, 2004 || Palomar || NEAT || — || align=right | 1.7 km || 
|-id=757 bgcolor=#E9E9E9
| 211757 ||  || — || January 16, 2004 || Palomar || NEAT || AEO || align=right | 1.6 km || 
|-id=758 bgcolor=#E9E9E9
| 211758 ||  || — || January 16, 2004 || Palomar || NEAT || — || align=right | 3.7 km || 
|-id=759 bgcolor=#E9E9E9
| 211759 ||  || — || January 18, 2004 || Palomar || NEAT || — || align=right | 4.0 km || 
|-id=760 bgcolor=#E9E9E9
| 211760 ||  || — || January 17, 2004 || Palomar || NEAT || — || align=right | 2.7 km || 
|-id=761 bgcolor=#fefefe
| 211761 ||  || — || January 19, 2004 || Anderson Mesa || LONEOS || NYS || align=right data-sort-value="0.93" | 930 m || 
|-id=762 bgcolor=#E9E9E9
| 211762 ||  || — || January 16, 2004 || Kitt Peak || Spacewatch || — || align=right | 2.0 km || 
|-id=763 bgcolor=#E9E9E9
| 211763 ||  || — || January 21, 2004 || Socorro || LINEAR || — || align=right | 3.4 km || 
|-id=764 bgcolor=#E9E9E9
| 211764 ||  || — || January 21, 2004 || Socorro || LINEAR || — || align=right | 3.4 km || 
|-id=765 bgcolor=#E9E9E9
| 211765 ||  || — || January 21, 2004 || Socorro || LINEAR || — || align=right | 1.4 km || 
|-id=766 bgcolor=#E9E9E9
| 211766 ||  || — || January 21, 2004 || Socorro || LINEAR || — || align=right | 1.7 km || 
|-id=767 bgcolor=#E9E9E9
| 211767 ||  || — || January 21, 2004 || Socorro || LINEAR || — || align=right | 3.4 km || 
|-id=768 bgcolor=#E9E9E9
| 211768 ||  || — || January 22, 2004 || Socorro || LINEAR || — || align=right | 3.5 km || 
|-id=769 bgcolor=#E9E9E9
| 211769 ||  || — || January 22, 2004 || Socorro || LINEAR || WIT || align=right | 1.6 km || 
|-id=770 bgcolor=#E9E9E9
| 211770 ||  || — || January 22, 2004 || Socorro || LINEAR || HEN || align=right | 1.5 km || 
|-id=771 bgcolor=#E9E9E9
| 211771 ||  || — || January 24, 2004 || Socorro || LINEAR || — || align=right | 3.7 km || 
|-id=772 bgcolor=#d6d6d6
| 211772 ||  || — || January 24, 2004 || Socorro || LINEAR || — || align=right | 4.3 km || 
|-id=773 bgcolor=#E9E9E9
| 211773 ||  || — || January 24, 2004 || Socorro || LINEAR || — || align=right | 3.2 km || 
|-id=774 bgcolor=#E9E9E9
| 211774 ||  || — || January 27, 2004 || Kitt Peak || Spacewatch || WIT || align=right | 1.7 km || 
|-id=775 bgcolor=#E9E9E9
| 211775 ||  || — || January 27, 2004 || Kitt Peak || Spacewatch || AGN || align=right | 1.5 km || 
|-id=776 bgcolor=#E9E9E9
| 211776 ||  || — || January 26, 2004 || Anderson Mesa || LONEOS || — || align=right | 2.8 km || 
|-id=777 bgcolor=#E9E9E9
| 211777 ||  || — || January 28, 2004 || Catalina || CSS || — || align=right | 4.3 km || 
|-id=778 bgcolor=#E9E9E9
| 211778 ||  || — || January 31, 2004 || Socorro || LINEAR || — || align=right | 4.5 km || 
|-id=779 bgcolor=#E9E9E9
| 211779 ||  || — || January 16, 2004 || Kitt Peak || Spacewatch || — || align=right | 1.8 km || 
|-id=780 bgcolor=#E9E9E9
| 211780 ||  || — || January 16, 2004 || Kitt Peak || Spacewatch || — || align=right | 1.9 km || 
|-id=781 bgcolor=#E9E9E9
| 211781 ||  || — || January 19, 2004 || Kitt Peak || Spacewatch || — || align=right | 1.8 km || 
|-id=782 bgcolor=#E9E9E9
| 211782 ||  || — || January 19, 2004 || Kitt Peak || Spacewatch || — || align=right | 1.9 km || 
|-id=783 bgcolor=#E9E9E9
| 211783 ||  || — || January 16, 2004 || Kitt Peak || Spacewatch || — || align=right | 2.5 km || 
|-id=784 bgcolor=#E9E9E9
| 211784 ||  || — || February 11, 2004 || Kitt Peak || Spacewatch || — || align=right | 2.2 km || 
|-id=785 bgcolor=#E9E9E9
| 211785 ||  || — || February 12, 2004 || Kitt Peak || Spacewatch || — || align=right | 2.1 km || 
|-id=786 bgcolor=#E9E9E9
| 211786 ||  || — || February 12, 2004 || Kitt Peak || Spacewatch || AGN || align=right | 1.5 km || 
|-id=787 bgcolor=#E9E9E9
| 211787 ||  || — || February 12, 2004 || Kitt Peak || Spacewatch || — || align=right | 2.7 km || 
|-id=788 bgcolor=#E9E9E9
| 211788 ||  || — || February 13, 2004 || Kitt Peak || Spacewatch || — || align=right | 3.5 km || 
|-id=789 bgcolor=#E9E9E9
| 211789 ||  || — || February 10, 2004 || Palomar || NEAT || AEO || align=right | 1.5 km || 
|-id=790 bgcolor=#E9E9E9
| 211790 ||  || — || February 11, 2004 || Kitt Peak || Spacewatch || — || align=right | 2.2 km || 
|-id=791 bgcolor=#E9E9E9
| 211791 ||  || — || February 14, 2004 || Haleakala || NEAT || AEO || align=right | 1.6 km || 
|-id=792 bgcolor=#E9E9E9
| 211792 ||  || — || February 11, 2004 || Kitt Peak || Spacewatch || HEN || align=right | 1.7 km || 
|-id=793 bgcolor=#E9E9E9
| 211793 ||  || — || February 11, 2004 || Palomar || NEAT || WIT || align=right | 1.7 km || 
|-id=794 bgcolor=#E9E9E9
| 211794 ||  || — || February 11, 2004 || Palomar || NEAT || — || align=right | 3.2 km || 
|-id=795 bgcolor=#E9E9E9
| 211795 ||  || — || February 11, 2004 || Palomar || NEAT || — || align=right | 2.9 km || 
|-id=796 bgcolor=#d6d6d6
| 211796 ||  || — || February 15, 2004 || Catalina || CSS || JLI || align=right | 5.2 km || 
|-id=797 bgcolor=#E9E9E9
| 211797 ||  || — || February 13, 2004 || Palomar || NEAT || GEF || align=right | 2.3 km || 
|-id=798 bgcolor=#E9E9E9
| 211798 ||  || — || February 13, 2004 || Anderson Mesa || LONEOS || MRX || align=right | 1.3 km || 
|-id=799 bgcolor=#d6d6d6
| 211799 ||  || — || February 12, 2004 || Kitt Peak || Spacewatch || — || align=right | 2.9 km || 
|-id=800 bgcolor=#E9E9E9
| 211800 ||  || — || February 12, 2004 || Kitt Peak || Spacewatch || WIT || align=right | 1.6 km || 
|}

211801–211900 

|-bgcolor=#E9E9E9
| 211801 ||  || — || February 12, 2004 || Kitt Peak || Spacewatch || WIT || align=right | 1.4 km || 
|-id=802 bgcolor=#d6d6d6
| 211802 ||  || — || February 17, 2004 || Kitt Peak || Spacewatch || — || align=right | 4.4 km || 
|-id=803 bgcolor=#E9E9E9
| 211803 ||  || — || February 16, 2004 || Kitt Peak || Spacewatch || — || align=right | 2.9 km || 
|-id=804 bgcolor=#d6d6d6
| 211804 ||  || — || February 17, 2004 || Kitt Peak || Spacewatch || K-2 || align=right | 1.7 km || 
|-id=805 bgcolor=#d6d6d6
| 211805 ||  || — || February 17, 2004 || Socorro || LINEAR || — || align=right | 3.8 km || 
|-id=806 bgcolor=#E9E9E9
| 211806 ||  || — || February 18, 2004 || Desert Eagle || W. K. Y. Yeung || — || align=right | 3.1 km || 
|-id=807 bgcolor=#E9E9E9
| 211807 ||  || — || February 16, 2004 || Socorro || LINEAR || NEM || align=right | 3.9 km || 
|-id=808 bgcolor=#E9E9E9
| 211808 ||  || — || February 17, 2004 || Kitt Peak || Spacewatch || HOF || align=right | 3.4 km || 
|-id=809 bgcolor=#d6d6d6
| 211809 ||  || — || February 19, 2004 || Kvistaberg || UDAS || — || align=right | 3.1 km || 
|-id=810 bgcolor=#E9E9E9
| 211810 ||  || — || February 22, 2004 || Kitt Peak || Spacewatch || HEN || align=right | 1.5 km || 
|-id=811 bgcolor=#E9E9E9
| 211811 ||  || — || February 23, 2004 || Socorro || LINEAR || — || align=right | 2.5 km || 
|-id=812 bgcolor=#d6d6d6
| 211812 ||  || — || February 23, 2004 || Socorro || LINEAR || — || align=right | 4.5 km || 
|-id=813 bgcolor=#E9E9E9
| 211813 ||  || — || February 23, 2004 || Socorro || LINEAR || HEN || align=right | 1.6 km || 
|-id=814 bgcolor=#E9E9E9
| 211814 ||  || — || February 26, 2004 || Socorro || LINEAR || — || align=right | 3.4 km || 
|-id=815 bgcolor=#E9E9E9
| 211815 ||  || — || February 16, 2004 || Desert Eagle || W. K. Y. Yeung || — || align=right | 2.8 km || 
|-id=816 bgcolor=#d6d6d6
| 211816 ||  || — || March 11, 2004 || Palomar || NEAT || — || align=right | 4.7 km || 
|-id=817 bgcolor=#d6d6d6
| 211817 ||  || — || March 12, 2004 || Palomar || NEAT || — || align=right | 3.9 km || 
|-id=818 bgcolor=#d6d6d6
| 211818 ||  || — || March 12, 2004 || Palomar || NEAT || KOR || align=right | 2.2 km || 
|-id=819 bgcolor=#d6d6d6
| 211819 ||  || — || March 12, 2004 || Palomar || NEAT || — || align=right | 5.4 km || 
|-id=820 bgcolor=#E9E9E9
| 211820 ||  || — || March 12, 2004 || Palomar || NEAT || — || align=right | 3.8 km || 
|-id=821 bgcolor=#d6d6d6
| 211821 ||  || — || March 13, 2004 || Palomar || NEAT || EOS || align=right | 3.1 km || 
|-id=822 bgcolor=#fefefe
| 211822 ||  || — || March 15, 2004 || Socorro || LINEAR || H || align=right | 1.4 km || 
|-id=823 bgcolor=#d6d6d6
| 211823 ||  || — || March 15, 2004 || Campo Imperatore || CINEOS || — || align=right | 3.8 km || 
|-id=824 bgcolor=#d6d6d6
| 211824 ||  || — || March 15, 2004 || Catalina || CSS || — || align=right | 3.0 km || 
|-id=825 bgcolor=#d6d6d6
| 211825 ||  || — || March 14, 2004 || Kitt Peak || Spacewatch || — || align=right | 2.5 km || 
|-id=826 bgcolor=#d6d6d6
| 211826 ||  || — || March 13, 2004 || Palomar || NEAT || — || align=right | 4.4 km || 
|-id=827 bgcolor=#d6d6d6
| 211827 ||  || — || March 15, 2004 || Catalina || CSS || — || align=right | 3.4 km || 
|-id=828 bgcolor=#d6d6d6
| 211828 ||  || — || March 14, 2004 || Palomar || NEAT || — || align=right | 4.1 km || 
|-id=829 bgcolor=#d6d6d6
| 211829 ||  || — || March 15, 2004 || Palomar || NEAT || — || align=right | 4.4 km || 
|-id=830 bgcolor=#d6d6d6
| 211830 ||  || — || March 15, 2004 || Socorro || LINEAR || — || align=right | 3.6 km || 
|-id=831 bgcolor=#d6d6d6
| 211831 ||  || — || March 15, 2004 || Kitt Peak || Spacewatch || — || align=right | 2.7 km || 
|-id=832 bgcolor=#d6d6d6
| 211832 ||  || — || March 14, 2004 || Socorro || LINEAR || FIR || align=right | 6.0 km || 
|-id=833 bgcolor=#d6d6d6
| 211833 ||  || — || March 15, 2004 || Socorro || LINEAR || — || align=right | 3.7 km || 
|-id=834 bgcolor=#d6d6d6
| 211834 ||  || — || March 15, 2004 || Catalina || CSS || KOR || align=right | 2.2 km || 
|-id=835 bgcolor=#d6d6d6
| 211835 ||  || — || March 15, 2004 || Kitt Peak || Spacewatch || 628 || align=right | 3.2 km || 
|-id=836 bgcolor=#d6d6d6
| 211836 ||  || — || March 17, 2004 || Goodricke-Pigott || R. A. Tucker || — || align=right | 3.0 km || 
|-id=837 bgcolor=#fefefe
| 211837 ||  || — || March 26, 2004 || Socorro || LINEAR || H || align=right | 1.2 km || 
|-id=838 bgcolor=#fefefe
| 211838 ||  || — || March 27, 2004 || Socorro || LINEAR || H || align=right | 1.0 km || 
|-id=839 bgcolor=#d6d6d6
| 211839 ||  || — || March 16, 2004 || Catalina || CSS || — || align=right | 5.0 km || 
|-id=840 bgcolor=#d6d6d6
| 211840 ||  || — || March 18, 2004 || Socorro || LINEAR || — || align=right | 3.8 km || 
|-id=841 bgcolor=#d6d6d6
| 211841 ||  || — || March 19, 2004 || Socorro || LINEAR || — || align=right | 5.1 km || 
|-id=842 bgcolor=#d6d6d6
| 211842 ||  || — || March 19, 2004 || Socorro || LINEAR || — || align=right | 3.6 km || 
|-id=843 bgcolor=#d6d6d6
| 211843 ||  || — || March 17, 2004 || Kitt Peak || Spacewatch || KAR || align=right | 1.6 km || 
|-id=844 bgcolor=#E9E9E9
| 211844 ||  || — || March 18, 2004 || Socorro || LINEAR || — || align=right | 2.9 km || 
|-id=845 bgcolor=#E9E9E9
| 211845 ||  || — || March 17, 2004 || Kitt Peak || Spacewatch || DOR || align=right | 3.7 km || 
|-id=846 bgcolor=#d6d6d6
| 211846 ||  || — || March 18, 2004 || Socorro || LINEAR || — || align=right | 4.7 km || 
|-id=847 bgcolor=#E9E9E9
| 211847 ||  || — || March 23, 2004 || Kitt Peak || Spacewatch || AGN || align=right | 1.7 km || 
|-id=848 bgcolor=#d6d6d6
| 211848 ||  || — || March 22, 2004 || Socorro || LINEAR || — || align=right | 4.3 km || 
|-id=849 bgcolor=#E9E9E9
| 211849 ||  || — || March 24, 2004 || Anderson Mesa || LONEOS || — || align=right | 3.2 km || 
|-id=850 bgcolor=#d6d6d6
| 211850 ||  || — || March 23, 2004 || Cordell-Lorenz || Cordell–Lorenz Obs. || — || align=right | 2.9 km || 
|-id=851 bgcolor=#d6d6d6
| 211851 ||  || — || March 26, 2004 || Anderson Mesa || LONEOS || — || align=right | 4.8 km || 
|-id=852 bgcolor=#d6d6d6
| 211852 ||  || — || March 27, 2004 || Socorro || LINEAR || — || align=right | 2.7 km || 
|-id=853 bgcolor=#d6d6d6
| 211853 ||  || — || March 28, 2004 || Socorro || LINEAR || — || align=right | 5.3 km || 
|-id=854 bgcolor=#d6d6d6
| 211854 ||  || — || March 28, 2004 || Socorro || LINEAR || — || align=right | 5.4 km || 
|-id=855 bgcolor=#d6d6d6
| 211855 ||  || — || March 28, 2004 || Socorro || LINEAR || — || align=right | 5.1 km || 
|-id=856 bgcolor=#d6d6d6
| 211856 ||  || — || March 29, 2004 || Socorro || LINEAR || EUP || align=right | 5.9 km || 
|-id=857 bgcolor=#fefefe
| 211857 ||  || — || March 23, 2004 || Socorro || LINEAR || H || align=right data-sort-value="0.79" | 790 m || 
|-id=858 bgcolor=#d6d6d6
| 211858 ||  || — || April 13, 2004 || Kitt Peak || Spacewatch || — || align=right | 4.4 km || 
|-id=859 bgcolor=#fefefe
| 211859 ||  || — || April 15, 2004 || Palomar || NEAT || H || align=right | 1.3 km || 
|-id=860 bgcolor=#fefefe
| 211860 ||  || — || April 15, 2004 || Siding Spring || SSS || H || align=right | 1.1 km || 
|-id=861 bgcolor=#d6d6d6
| 211861 ||  || — || April 14, 2004 || Kitt Peak || Spacewatch || — || align=right | 3.1 km || 
|-id=862 bgcolor=#d6d6d6
| 211862 ||  || — || April 15, 2004 || Palomar || NEAT || EOS || align=right | 3.1 km || 
|-id=863 bgcolor=#d6d6d6
| 211863 ||  || — || April 15, 2004 || Anderson Mesa || LONEOS || EOS || align=right | 3.0 km || 
|-id=864 bgcolor=#d6d6d6
| 211864 ||  || — || April 13, 2004 || Kitt Peak || Spacewatch || — || align=right | 2.7 km || 
|-id=865 bgcolor=#d6d6d6
| 211865 ||  || — || April 14, 2004 || Anderson Mesa || LONEOS || HYG || align=right | 5.4 km || 
|-id=866 bgcolor=#d6d6d6
| 211866 ||  || — || April 13, 2004 || Palomar || NEAT || — || align=right | 4.9 km || 
|-id=867 bgcolor=#d6d6d6
| 211867 ||  || — || April 14, 2004 || Kitt Peak || Spacewatch || — || align=right | 5.0 km || 
|-id=868 bgcolor=#d6d6d6
| 211868 ||  || — || April 13, 2004 || Kitt Peak || Spacewatch || — || align=right | 3.2 km || 
|-id=869 bgcolor=#d6d6d6
| 211869 ||  || — || April 13, 2004 || Kitt Peak || Spacewatch || — || align=right | 6.1 km || 
|-id=870 bgcolor=#d6d6d6
| 211870 ||  || — || April 12, 2004 || Palomar || NEAT || — || align=right | 3.5 km || 
|-id=871 bgcolor=#FFC2E0
| 211871 || 2004 HO || — || April 17, 2004 || Socorro || LINEAR || APO || align=right data-sort-value="0.41" | 410 m || 
|-id=872 bgcolor=#d6d6d6
| 211872 ||  || — || April 16, 2004 || Kitt Peak || Spacewatch || EOS || align=right | 2.4 km || 
|-id=873 bgcolor=#d6d6d6
| 211873 ||  || — || April 19, 2004 || Kitt Peak || Spacewatch || — || align=right | 3.4 km || 
|-id=874 bgcolor=#d6d6d6
| 211874 ||  || — || April 19, 2004 || Socorro || LINEAR || — || align=right | 4.1 km || 
|-id=875 bgcolor=#d6d6d6
| 211875 ||  || — || April 20, 2004 || Kitt Peak || Spacewatch || — || align=right | 5.7 km || 
|-id=876 bgcolor=#E9E9E9
| 211876 ||  || — || April 21, 2004 || Catalina || CSS || MAR || align=right | 1.8 km || 
|-id=877 bgcolor=#d6d6d6
| 211877 ||  || — || April 23, 2004 || Kitt Peak || Spacewatch || — || align=right | 5.9 km || 
|-id=878 bgcolor=#d6d6d6
| 211878 ||  || — || April 24, 2004 || Socorro || LINEAR || — || align=right | 5.1 km || 
|-id=879 bgcolor=#d6d6d6
| 211879 ||  || — || April 24, 2004 || Haleakala || NEAT || MEL || align=right | 5.4 km || 
|-id=880 bgcolor=#fefefe
| 211880 ||  || — || April 25, 2004 || Anderson Mesa || LONEOS || H || align=right data-sort-value="0.83" | 830 m || 
|-id=881 bgcolor=#d6d6d6
| 211881 ||  || — || April 24, 2004 || Kitt Peak || Spacewatch || CRO || align=right | 2.9 km || 
|-id=882 bgcolor=#d6d6d6
| 211882 ||  || — || April 20, 2004 || Kitt Peak || Spacewatch || EOS || align=right | 2.3 km || 
|-id=883 bgcolor=#fefefe
| 211883 ||  || — || April 16, 2004 || Apache Point || SDSS || H || align=right | 1.0 km || 
|-id=884 bgcolor=#E9E9E9
| 211884 ||  || — || May 12, 2004 || Desert Eagle || W. K. Y. Yeung || NEM || align=right | 3.0 km || 
|-id=885 bgcolor=#d6d6d6
| 211885 ||  || — || May 13, 2004 || Socorro || LINEAR || — || align=right | 4.5 km || 
|-id=886 bgcolor=#d6d6d6
| 211886 ||  || — || May 13, 2004 || Socorro || LINEAR || EUP || align=right | 4.2 km || 
|-id=887 bgcolor=#d6d6d6
| 211887 ||  || — || May 9, 2004 || Kitt Peak || Spacewatch || HYG || align=right | 3.6 km || 
|-id=888 bgcolor=#d6d6d6
| 211888 ||  || — || May 10, 2004 || Kitt Peak || Spacewatch || — || align=right | 4.0 km || 
|-id=889 bgcolor=#d6d6d6
| 211889 ||  || — || May 11, 2004 || Anderson Mesa || LONEOS || HYG || align=right | 4.1 km || 
|-id=890 bgcolor=#d6d6d6
| 211890 ||  || — || May 13, 2004 || Anderson Mesa || LONEOS || — || align=right | 2.2 km || 
|-id=891 bgcolor=#d6d6d6
| 211891 ||  || — || May 13, 2004 || Palomar || NEAT || — || align=right | 5.3 km || 
|-id=892 bgcolor=#E9E9E9
| 211892 ||  || — || May 15, 2004 || Socorro || LINEAR || ADE || align=right | 3.4 km || 
|-id=893 bgcolor=#d6d6d6
| 211893 ||  || — || May 15, 2004 || Siding Spring || SSS || — || align=right | 5.4 km || 
|-id=894 bgcolor=#d6d6d6
| 211894 ||  || — || May 15, 2004 || Socorro || LINEAR || — || align=right | 2.7 km || 
|-id=895 bgcolor=#d6d6d6
| 211895 ||  || — || May 15, 2004 || Socorro || LINEAR || LIX || align=right | 5.5 km || 
|-id=896 bgcolor=#d6d6d6
| 211896 ||  || — || May 15, 2004 || Socorro || LINEAR || — || align=right | 3.8 km || 
|-id=897 bgcolor=#d6d6d6
| 211897 ||  || — || May 14, 2004 || Kitt Peak || Spacewatch || — || align=right | 3.9 km || 
|-id=898 bgcolor=#d6d6d6
| 211898 ||  || — || May 14, 2004 || Kitt Peak || Spacewatch || — || align=right | 3.7 km || 
|-id=899 bgcolor=#d6d6d6
| 211899 ||  || — || May 15, 2004 || Socorro || LINEAR || — || align=right | 6.4 km || 
|-id=900 bgcolor=#d6d6d6
| 211900 ||  || — || May 9, 2004 || Kitt Peak || Spacewatch || — || align=right | 3.6 km || 
|}

211901–212000 

|-bgcolor=#d6d6d6
| 211901 ||  || — || May 10, 2004 || Kitt Peak || Spacewatch || — || align=right | 3.0 km || 
|-id=902 bgcolor=#d6d6d6
| 211902 ||  || — || May 23, 2004 || Kitt Peak || Spacewatch || — || align=right | 4.2 km || 
|-id=903 bgcolor=#d6d6d6
| 211903 ||  || — || June 11, 2004 || Socorro || LINEAR || LIX || align=right | 7.0 km || 
|-id=904 bgcolor=#d6d6d6
| 211904 ||  || — || June 11, 2004 || Kitt Peak || Spacewatch || URS || align=right | 5.2 km || 
|-id=905 bgcolor=#d6d6d6
| 211905 ||  || — || June 12, 2004 || Socorro || LINEAR || — || align=right | 5.1 km || 
|-id=906 bgcolor=#d6d6d6
| 211906 ||  || — || June 14, 2004 || Kitt Peak || Spacewatch || — || align=right | 3.0 km || 
|-id=907 bgcolor=#fefefe
| 211907 ||  || — || July 14, 2004 || Socorro || LINEAR || H || align=right data-sort-value="0.88" | 880 m || 
|-id=908 bgcolor=#d6d6d6
| 211908 ||  || — || July 12, 2004 || Siding Spring || SSS || — || align=right | 5.3 km || 
|-id=909 bgcolor=#d6d6d6
| 211909 ||  || — || August 6, 2004 || Campo Imperatore || CINEOS || TIR || align=right | 5.4 km || 
|-id=910 bgcolor=#fefefe
| 211910 ||  || — || August 6, 2004 || Campo Imperatore || CINEOS || H || align=right data-sort-value="0.78" | 780 m || 
|-id=911 bgcolor=#d6d6d6
| 211911 ||  || — || August 21, 2004 || Reedy Creek || J. Broughton || — || align=right | 4.1 km || 
|-id=912 bgcolor=#fefefe
| 211912 ||  || — || August 25, 2004 || Socorro || LINEAR || PHO || align=right | 2.0 km || 
|-id=913 bgcolor=#fefefe
| 211913 ||  || — || September 11, 2004 || Socorro || LINEAR || H || align=right data-sort-value="0.99" | 990 m || 
|-id=914 bgcolor=#FFC2E0
| 211914 ||  || — || September 14, 2004 || Socorro || LINEAR || AMO +1km || align=right | 1.0 km || 
|-id=915 bgcolor=#fefefe
| 211915 ||  || — || September 18, 2004 || Socorro || LINEAR || — || align=right | 4.1 km || 
|-id=916 bgcolor=#fefefe
| 211916 ||  || — || September 23, 2004 || Socorro || LINEAR || — || align=right | 1.1 km || 
|-id=917 bgcolor=#fefefe
| 211917 ||  || — || October 4, 2004 || Wrightwood || J. W. Young || — || align=right data-sort-value="0.93" | 930 m || 
|-id=918 bgcolor=#fefefe
| 211918 ||  || — || October 11, 2004 || Kitt Peak || Spacewatch || — || align=right data-sort-value="0.98" | 980 m || 
|-id=919 bgcolor=#fefefe
| 211919 ||  || — || October 4, 2004 || Kitt Peak || Spacewatch || — || align=right data-sort-value="0.78" | 780 m || 
|-id=920 bgcolor=#fefefe
| 211920 ||  || — || October 6, 2004 || Kitt Peak || Spacewatch || — || align=right | 1.0 km || 
|-id=921 bgcolor=#fefefe
| 211921 ||  || — || October 5, 2004 || Kitt Peak || Spacewatch || — || align=right data-sort-value="0.61" | 610 m || 
|-id=922 bgcolor=#fefefe
| 211922 ||  || — || October 6, 2004 || Palomar || NEAT || — || align=right data-sort-value="0.89" | 890 m || 
|-id=923 bgcolor=#E9E9E9
| 211923 ||  || — || October 8, 2004 || Socorro || LINEAR || — || align=right | 1.8 km || 
|-id=924 bgcolor=#fefefe
| 211924 ||  || — || October 9, 2004 || Kitt Peak || Spacewatch || FLO || align=right data-sort-value="0.94" | 940 m || 
|-id=925 bgcolor=#fefefe
| 211925 ||  || — || October 11, 2004 || Kitt Peak || Spacewatch || — || align=right data-sort-value="0.87" | 870 m || 
|-id=926 bgcolor=#fefefe
| 211926 ||  || — || October 21, 2004 || Socorro || LINEAR || FLO || align=right data-sort-value="0.82" | 820 m || 
|-id=927 bgcolor=#fefefe
| 211927 ||  || — || November 3, 2004 || Kitt Peak || Spacewatch || — || align=right data-sort-value="0.99" | 990 m || 
|-id=928 bgcolor=#fefefe
| 211928 ||  || — || November 3, 2004 || Catalina || CSS || FLO || align=right data-sort-value="0.92" | 920 m || 
|-id=929 bgcolor=#fefefe
| 211929 ||  || — || November 3, 2004 || Palomar || NEAT || — || align=right | 1.1 km || 
|-id=930 bgcolor=#fefefe
| 211930 ||  || — || November 4, 2004 || Catalina || CSS || — || align=right data-sort-value="0.84" | 840 m || 
|-id=931 bgcolor=#fefefe
| 211931 ||  || — || November 4, 2004 || Kitt Peak || Spacewatch || — || align=right | 1.1 km || 
|-id=932 bgcolor=#fefefe
| 211932 ||  || — || November 3, 2004 || Catalina || CSS || FLO || align=right | 1.0 km || 
|-id=933 bgcolor=#fefefe
| 211933 ||  || — || December 2, 2004 || Socorro || LINEAR || — || align=right | 1.2 km || 
|-id=934 bgcolor=#fefefe
| 211934 ||  || — || December 2, 2004 || Socorro || LINEAR || — || align=right | 1.3 km || 
|-id=935 bgcolor=#fefefe
| 211935 ||  || — || December 2, 2004 || Palomar || NEAT || FLO || align=right data-sort-value="0.85" | 850 m || 
|-id=936 bgcolor=#fefefe
| 211936 ||  || — || December 8, 2004 || Socorro || LINEAR || FLO || align=right data-sort-value="0.81" | 810 m || 
|-id=937 bgcolor=#fefefe
| 211937 ||  || — || December 8, 2004 || Socorro || LINEAR || FLO || align=right | 1.0 km || 
|-id=938 bgcolor=#fefefe
| 211938 ||  || — || December 9, 2004 || Catalina || CSS || — || align=right | 1.6 km || 
|-id=939 bgcolor=#fefefe
| 211939 ||  || — || December 11, 2004 || Campo Imperatore || CINEOS || — || align=right | 1.1 km || 
|-id=940 bgcolor=#fefefe
| 211940 ||  || — || December 14, 2004 || Campo Imperatore || CINEOS || — || align=right | 1.1 km || 
|-id=941 bgcolor=#fefefe
| 211941 ||  || — || December 12, 2004 || Kitt Peak || Spacewatch || MAS || align=right data-sort-value="0.78" | 780 m || 
|-id=942 bgcolor=#fefefe
| 211942 ||  || — || December 2, 2004 || Kitt Peak || Spacewatch || NYS || align=right data-sort-value="0.92" | 920 m || 
|-id=943 bgcolor=#fefefe
| 211943 ||  || — || December 10, 2004 || Socorro || LINEAR || — || align=right | 1.0 km || 
|-id=944 bgcolor=#fefefe
| 211944 ||  || — || December 10, 2004 || Socorro || LINEAR || NYS || align=right data-sort-value="0.75" | 750 m || 
|-id=945 bgcolor=#fefefe
| 211945 ||  || — || December 11, 2004 || Kitt Peak || Spacewatch || — || align=right data-sort-value="0.89" | 890 m || 
|-id=946 bgcolor=#fefefe
| 211946 ||  || — || December 11, 2004 || Socorro || LINEAR || FLO || align=right data-sort-value="0.86" | 860 m || 
|-id=947 bgcolor=#fefefe
| 211947 ||  || — || December 14, 2004 || Socorro || LINEAR || NYS || align=right data-sort-value="0.86" | 860 m || 
|-id=948 bgcolor=#fefefe
| 211948 ||  || — || December 14, 2004 || Socorro || LINEAR || V || align=right | 1.0 km || 
|-id=949 bgcolor=#fefefe
| 211949 ||  || — || December 12, 2004 || Kitt Peak || Spacewatch || — || align=right data-sort-value="0.87" | 870 m || 
|-id=950 bgcolor=#fefefe
| 211950 ||  || — || December 14, 2004 || Catalina || CSS || — || align=right | 2.2 km || 
|-id=951 bgcolor=#fefefe
| 211951 ||  || — || December 14, 2004 || Socorro || LINEAR || FLO || align=right | 1.0 km || 
|-id=952 bgcolor=#E9E9E9
| 211952 ||  || — || December 13, 2004 || Socorro || LINEAR || MAR || align=right | 1.8 km || 
|-id=953 bgcolor=#fefefe
| 211953 ||  || — || December 15, 2004 || Kitt Peak || Spacewatch || MAS || align=right | 1.00 km || 
|-id=954 bgcolor=#fefefe
| 211954 ||  || — || December 14, 2004 || Kitt Peak || Spacewatch || — || align=right data-sort-value="0.85" | 850 m || 
|-id=955 bgcolor=#fefefe
| 211955 ||  || — || December 15, 2004 || Socorro || LINEAR || — || align=right | 1.3 km || 
|-id=956 bgcolor=#fefefe
| 211956 ||  || — || December 2, 2004 || Kitt Peak || Spacewatch || — || align=right data-sort-value="0.90" | 900 m || 
|-id=957 bgcolor=#fefefe
| 211957 ||  || — || December 16, 2004 || Kitt Peak || Spacewatch || NYS || align=right data-sort-value="0.93" | 930 m || 
|-id=958 bgcolor=#fefefe
| 211958 ||  || — || December 18, 2004 || Mount Lemmon || Mount Lemmon Survey || — || align=right | 1.1 km || 
|-id=959 bgcolor=#fefefe
| 211959 ||  || — || December 18, 2004 || Mount Lemmon || Mount Lemmon Survey || — || align=right | 2.3 km || 
|-id=960 bgcolor=#fefefe
| 211960 ||  || — || December 20, 2004 || Mount Lemmon || Mount Lemmon Survey || — || align=right | 1.0 km || 
|-id=961 bgcolor=#fefefe
| 211961 ||  || — || December 18, 2004 || Socorro || LINEAR || — || align=right | 1.4 km || 
|-id=962 bgcolor=#fefefe
| 211962 ||  || — || January 6, 2005 || Catalina || CSS || — || align=right | 2.4 km || 
|-id=963 bgcolor=#fefefe
| 211963 ||  || — || January 6, 2005 || Catalina || CSS || — || align=right | 2.2 km || 
|-id=964 bgcolor=#fefefe
| 211964 ||  || — || January 6, 2005 || Catalina || CSS || NYS || align=right | 1.1 km || 
|-id=965 bgcolor=#fefefe
| 211965 ||  || — || January 6, 2005 || Catalina || CSS || — || align=right data-sort-value="0.84" | 840 m || 
|-id=966 bgcolor=#fefefe
| 211966 ||  || — || January 6, 2005 || Socorro || LINEAR || NYS || align=right data-sort-value="0.93" | 930 m || 
|-id=967 bgcolor=#fefefe
| 211967 ||  || — || January 6, 2005 || Socorro || LINEAR || V || align=right data-sort-value="0.95" | 950 m || 
|-id=968 bgcolor=#fefefe
| 211968 ||  || — || January 6, 2005 || Socorro || LINEAR || — || align=right | 1.1 km || 
|-id=969 bgcolor=#fefefe
| 211969 ||  || — || January 6, 2005 || Socorro || LINEAR || — || align=right | 1.2 km || 
|-id=970 bgcolor=#fefefe
| 211970 ||  || — || January 6, 2005 || Socorro || LINEAR || — || align=right data-sort-value="0.98" | 980 m || 
|-id=971 bgcolor=#fefefe
| 211971 ||  || — || January 6, 2005 || Socorro || LINEAR || NYS || align=right | 2.2 km || 
|-id=972 bgcolor=#fefefe
| 211972 ||  || — || January 6, 2005 || Socorro || LINEAR || NYS || align=right | 1.1 km || 
|-id=973 bgcolor=#fefefe
| 211973 ||  || — || January 6, 2005 || Socorro || LINEAR || NYS || align=right | 1.0 km || 
|-id=974 bgcolor=#fefefe
| 211974 ||  || — || January 6, 2005 || Socorro || LINEAR || NYS || align=right | 1.1 km || 
|-id=975 bgcolor=#fefefe
| 211975 ||  || — || January 7, 2005 || Socorro || LINEAR || V || align=right | 1.1 km || 
|-id=976 bgcolor=#fefefe
| 211976 ||  || — || January 12, 2005 || Socorro || LINEAR || NYS || align=right data-sort-value="0.81" | 810 m || 
|-id=977 bgcolor=#fefefe
| 211977 ||  || — || January 13, 2005 || Kitt Peak || Spacewatch || — || align=right data-sort-value="0.94" | 940 m || 
|-id=978 bgcolor=#fefefe
| 211978 ||  || — || January 8, 2005 || Campo Imperatore || CINEOS || — || align=right | 1.1 km || 
|-id=979 bgcolor=#fefefe
| 211979 ||  || — || January 11, 2005 || Socorro || LINEAR || FLO || align=right | 1.1 km || 
|-id=980 bgcolor=#fefefe
| 211980 ||  || — || January 12, 2005 || Socorro || LINEAR || V || align=right | 1.1 km || 
|-id=981 bgcolor=#fefefe
| 211981 ||  || — || January 13, 2005 || Kitt Peak || Spacewatch || V || align=right data-sort-value="0.93" | 930 m || 
|-id=982 bgcolor=#fefefe
| 211982 ||  || — || January 13, 2005 || Catalina || CSS || — || align=right data-sort-value="0.99" | 990 m || 
|-id=983 bgcolor=#fefefe
| 211983 ||  || — || January 15, 2005 || Socorro || LINEAR || — || align=right | 1.2 km || 
|-id=984 bgcolor=#fefefe
| 211984 ||  || — || January 15, 2005 || Kitt Peak || Spacewatch || MAS || align=right | 1.2 km || 
|-id=985 bgcolor=#fefefe
| 211985 ||  || — || January 15, 2005 || Kitt Peak || Spacewatch || V || align=right data-sort-value="0.86" | 860 m || 
|-id=986 bgcolor=#fefefe
| 211986 ||  || — || January 15, 2005 || Kitt Peak || Spacewatch || NYS || align=right | 1.0 km || 
|-id=987 bgcolor=#fefefe
| 211987 ||  || — || January 15, 2005 || Kitt Peak || Spacewatch || — || align=right | 1.3 km || 
|-id=988 bgcolor=#fefefe
| 211988 ||  || — || January 15, 2005 || Socorro || LINEAR || MAS || align=right data-sort-value="0.92" | 920 m || 
|-id=989 bgcolor=#fefefe
| 211989 ||  || — || January 15, 2005 || Socorro || LINEAR || — || align=right data-sort-value="0.77" | 770 m || 
|-id=990 bgcolor=#fefefe
| 211990 ||  || — || January 15, 2005 || Socorro || LINEAR || FLO || align=right | 1.1 km || 
|-id=991 bgcolor=#fefefe
| 211991 ||  || — || January 15, 2005 || Kitt Peak || Spacewatch || — || align=right | 1.1 km || 
|-id=992 bgcolor=#C2FFFF
| 211992 ||  || — || January 15, 2005 || Kitt Peak || Spacewatch || L5 || align=right | 12 km || 
|-id=993 bgcolor=#fefefe
| 211993 ||  || — || January 15, 2005 || Kitt Peak || Spacewatch || — || align=right | 1.1 km || 
|-id=994 bgcolor=#fefefe
| 211994 ||  || — || January 15, 2005 || Kitt Peak || Spacewatch || MAS || align=right data-sort-value="0.76" | 760 m || 
|-id=995 bgcolor=#fefefe
| 211995 ||  || — || January 15, 2005 || Kitt Peak || Spacewatch || NYS || align=right data-sort-value="0.93" | 930 m || 
|-id=996 bgcolor=#fefefe
| 211996 ||  || — || January 15, 2005 || Kitt Peak || Spacewatch || — || align=right | 1.1 km || 
|-id=997 bgcolor=#E9E9E9
| 211997 ||  || — || January 15, 2005 || Kitt Peak || Spacewatch || — || align=right | 1.2 km || 
|-id=998 bgcolor=#fefefe
| 211998 ||  || — || January 16, 2005 || Kitt Peak || Spacewatch || V || align=right data-sort-value="0.94" | 940 m || 
|-id=999 bgcolor=#fefefe
| 211999 ||  || — || January 16, 2005 || Socorro || LINEAR || NYS || align=right data-sort-value="0.89" | 890 m || 
|-id=000 bgcolor=#fefefe
| 212000 ||  || — || January 16, 2005 || Socorro || LINEAR || — || align=right | 1.1 km || 
|}

References

External links 
 Discovery Circumstances: Numbered Minor Planets (210001)–(215000) (IAU Minor Planet Center)

0211